= List of municipalities of the Province of Treviso =

The following is a list of the 94 municipalities (comuni) of the Province of Treviso in the region of Veneto in Italy.

== List ==
Municipality	Population (2026)	Area (km²)	Density
Altivole	7,088	21.95	322.9
Arcade	4,476	8.27	541.2
Asolo	8,917	25.37	351.5
Borso del Grappa	5,971	33.14	180.2
Breda di Piave	7,642	25.76	296.7
Caerano di San Marco	7,819	12.09	646.7
Cappella Maggiore	4,662	11.09	420.4
Carbonera	11,239	19.88	565.3
Casale sul Sile	13,067	26.92	485.4
Casier	11,425	13.43	850.7
Castelcucco	2,317	8.79	263.6
Castelfranco Veneto	33,241	51.61	644.1
Castello di Godego	6,898	18.13	380.5
Cavaso del Tomba	2,941	18.97	155.0
Cessalto	3,835	28.18	136.1
Chiarano	3,337	19.92	167.5
Cimadolmo	3,364	17.90	187.9
Cison di Valmarino	2,411	28.81	83.7
Codogné	5,246	21.75	241.2
Colle Umberto	4,972	13.58	366.1
Conegliano	34,675	36.38	953.1
Cordignano	6,784	26.25	258.4
Cornuda	6,017	12.51	481.0
Crocetta del Montello	6,074	26.57	228.6
Farra di Soligo	8,497	28.34	299.8
Follina	3,614	24.08	150.1
Fontanelle	5,559	35.35	157.3
Fonte	6,063	14.60	415.3
Fregona	2,738	42.72	64.1
Gaiarine	5,826	28.78	202.4
Giavera del Montello	5,110	20.19	253.1
Godega di Sant'Urbano	6,014	24.34	247.1
Gorgo al Monticano	3,976	27.09	146.8
Istrana	9,088	26.48	343.2
Loria	9,221	23.25	396.6
Mansuè	4,850	27.10	179.0
Mareno di Piave	9,353	27.77	336.8
Maser	5,094	25.85	197.1
Maserada sul Piave	9,149	28.77	318.0
Meduna di Livenza	2,972	15.38	193.2
Miane	2,978	30.88	96.4
Mogliano Veneto	28,145	46.26	608.4
Monastier di Treviso	4,432	25.26	175.5
Monfumo	1,300	11.45	113.5
Montebelluna	31,144	49.01	635.5
Morgano	4,513	11.76	383.8
Moriago della Battaglia	2,857	13.76	207.6
Motta di Livenza	10,522	37.78	278.5
Nervesa della Battaglia	6,595	34.97	188.6
Oderzo	20,348	42.35	480.5
Ormelle	4,480	18.83	237.9
Orsago	3,720	10.71	347.3
Paese	22,184	38.09	582.4
Pederobba	7,257	27.32	265.6
Pieve del Grappa	6,576	37.34	176.1
Pieve di Soligo	11,452	19.02	602.1
Ponte di Piave	8,331	32.44	256.8
Ponzano Veneto	13,027	22.27	585.0
Portobuffolé	747	5.08	147.0
Possagno	2,299	12.11	189.8
Povegliano	5,143	12.91	398.4
Preganziol	16,738	23.10	724.6
Quinto di Treviso	10,093	19.04	530.1
Refrontolo	1,697	13.04	130.1
Resana	9,340	24.89	375.3
Revine Lago	2,099	18.79	111.7
Riese Pio X	10,921	30.64	356.4
Roncade	14,592	61.78	236.2
Salgareda	6,523	27.55	236.8
San Biagio di Callalta	12,631	48.51	260.4
San Fior	6,843	17.82	384.0
San Pietro di Feletto	5,132	19.26	266.5
San Polo di Piave	4,795	20.98	228.6
San Vendemiano	9,680	18.51	523.0
San Zenone degli Ezzelini	7,318	19.97	366.4
Santa Lucia di Piave	9,056	19.81	457.1
Sarmede	2,960	18.01	164.4
Segusino	1,804	18.23	99.0
Sernaglia della Battaglia	6,145	20.15	305.0
Silea	10,459	18.95	551.9
Spresiano	12,400	25.73	481.9
Susegana	11,698	44.10	265.3
Tarzo	4,119	23.91	172.3
Trevignano	10,676	26.50	402.9
Treviso	86,113	55.58	1,549.4
Valdobbiadene	9,872	62.90	156.9
Vazzola	6,674	26.16	255.1
Vedelago	16,558	61.85	267.7
Vidor	3,559	13.43	265.0
Villorba	17,563	30.53	575.3
Vittorio Veneto	27,242	82.80	329.0
Volpago del Montello	9,989	44.82	222.9
Zenson di Piave	1,765	9.50	185.8
Zero Branco	11,695	26.06	448.8

== See also ==
- List of municipalities of Veneto
- List of municipalities of Italy
