= Ormelle =

- Comune
- Comune di Ormelle
- Location within Italy Location within Veneto
- Coordinates: 45°47′N 12°25′E
- Country: Italy
- Region: Veneto
- Province: Treviso (TV)
- Frazioni: Roncadelle e Tempio

Government
  - Mayor: Andrea Manente

Area
  - Total: 18.8 km^{2} (7.3 sq mi)
- Elevation: 22 m (72 ft)

Population (31 December 2015)
  - Total: 4,478
  - Density: 238/km^{2} (617/sq mi)
- Demonym: Ormellesi
- Time zone: UTC+1 (CET)
  - Summer (DST): UTC+2 (CEST)
- Postal code: 31010
- Dialing code: 0422
- Website: Official website

Ormelle is a comune (municipality) in the Province of Treviso in the Italian region Veneto, located about 40 kilometres (25 mi) north of Venice and about 20 kilometres (12 mi) northeast of Treviso.

Ormelle borders the following municipalities: Breda di Piave, Cimadolmo, Fontanelle, Maserada sul Piave, Oderzo, Ponte di Piave, and San Polo di Piave.
