= Maserada sul Piave =

- Comune
- Comune di Maserada sul Piave
- Coat of arms

- Location within Italy Location within Veneto
- Coordinates: 45°45′N 12°19′E
- Country: Italy
- Region: Veneto
- Province: Treviso (TV)
- Frazioni: Candelù, Varago, Salettuol

Government
  - Mayor: Lamberto Marini (center-right civic list "Lamberto Marini Sindaco")

Area
  - Total: 28.9 km^{2} (11.2 sq mi)
- Elevation: 34 m (112 ft)

Population (31 August 2002)Dato Istat
  - Total: 9,322
  - Density: 323/km^{2} (835/sq mi)
- Time zone: UTC+1 (CET)
  - Summer (DST): UTC+2 (CEST)
- Postal code: 31052
- Dialing code: 0422
- Patron saint: San Giorgio
- Saint day: 23 April
- Website: Official website

Maserada sul Piave is a comune (municipality) in the Province of Treviso in the Italian region Veneto, located about 35 kilometres (22 mi) north of Venice and about 11 kilometres (7 mi) northeast of Treviso.

Maserada sul Piave borders the following municipalities: Breda di Piave, Carbonera, Cimadolmo, Ormelle, Ponte di Piave, Spresiano.
