= Mareno di Piave =

- Comune
- Comune di Mareno di Piave
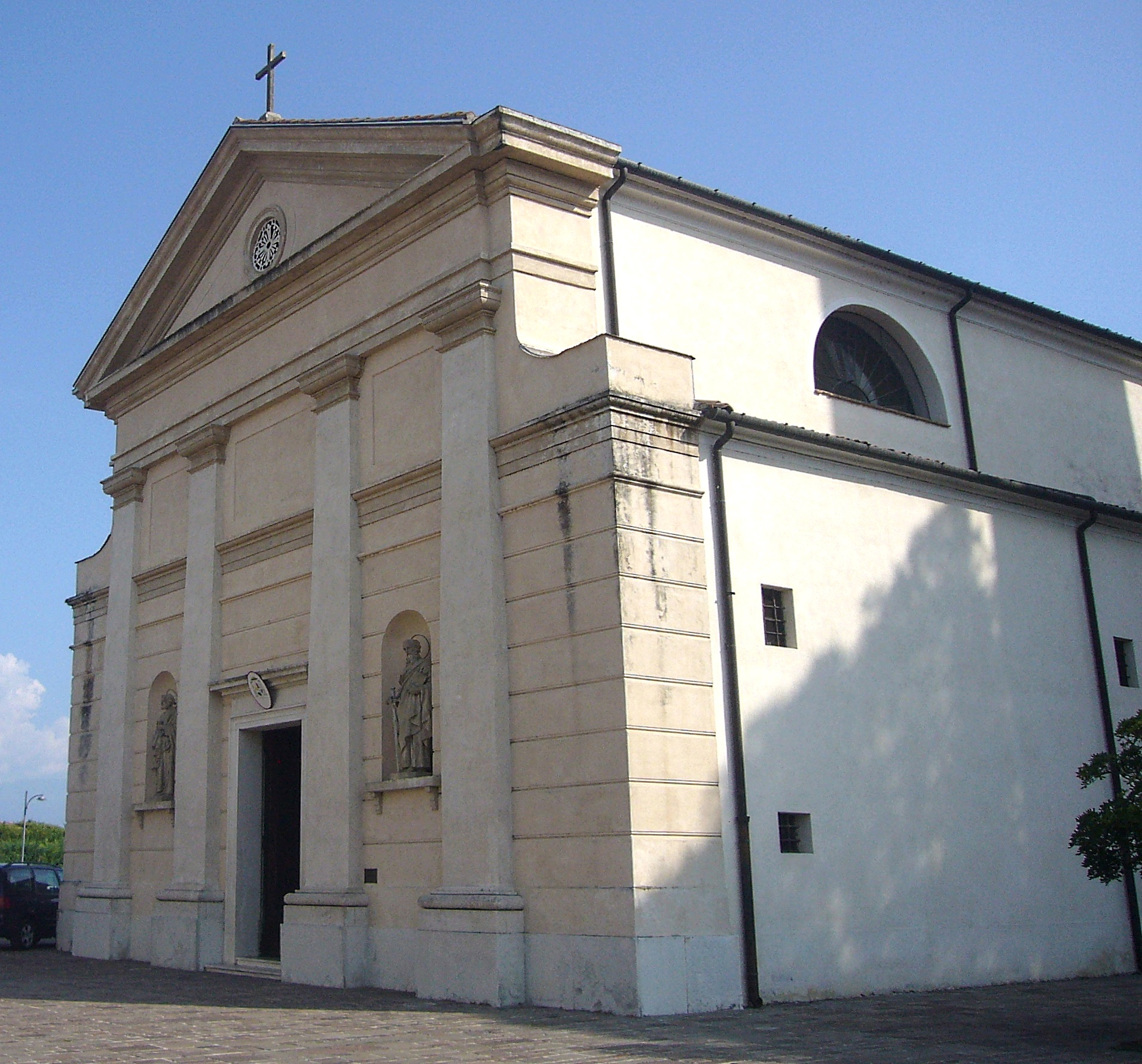
- Church of Saints Peter and Paul

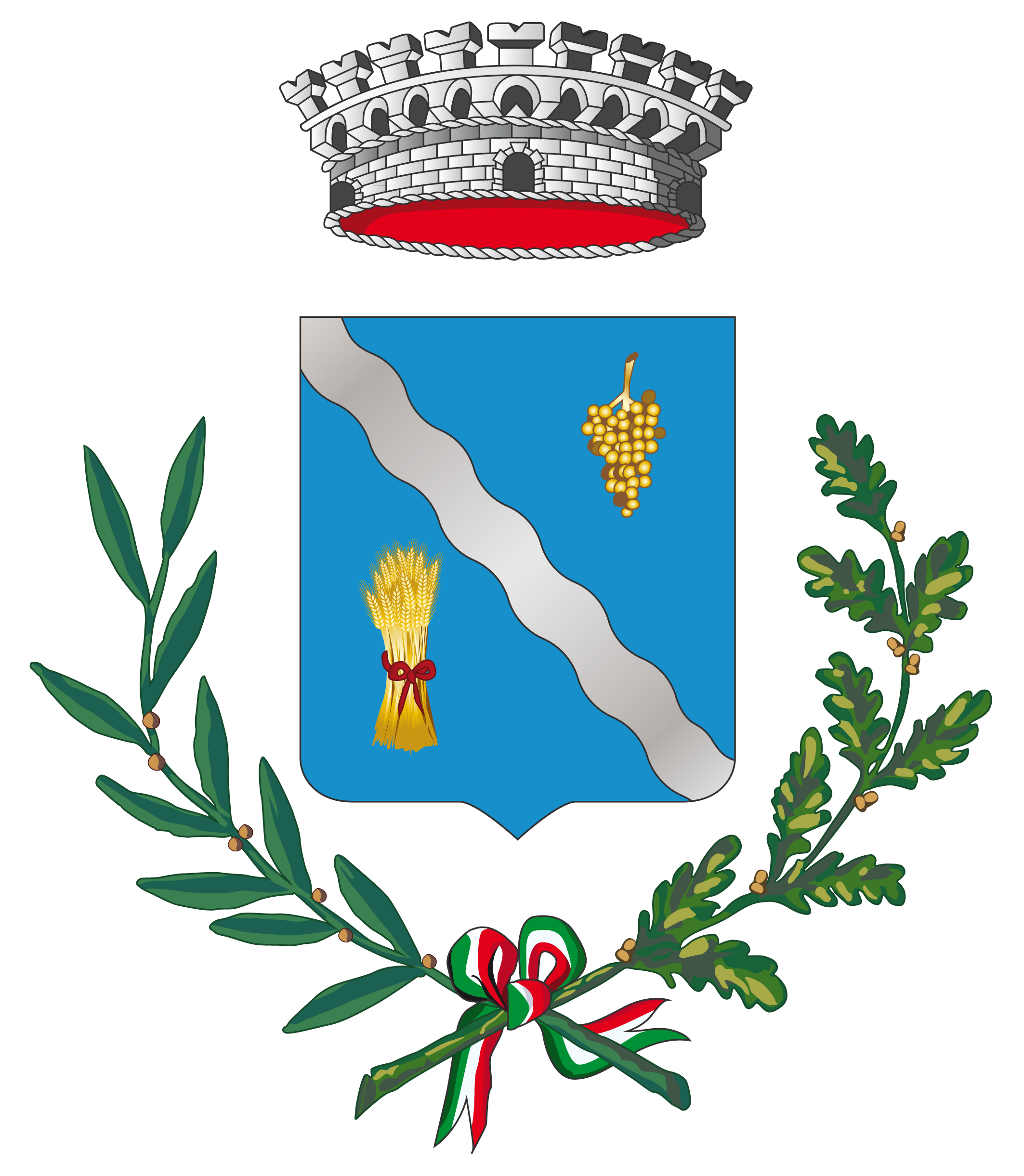
- Coat of arms

- Location within Italy Location within Veneto
- Coordinates: 45°51′N 12°21′E
- Country: Italy
- Region: Veneto
- Province: Province of Treviso (TV)
- Frazioni: Ramera, Soffratta, Santa Maria del Piave, Bocca di Strada

Government
  - Mayor: Eugenio Tocchet

Area
  - Total: 27.8 km^{2} (10.7 sq mi)

Population (Dec. 2004)
  - Total: 8,583
  - Density: 309/km^{2} (800/sq mi)
- Demonym: Marenesi
- Time zone: UTC+1 (CET)
  - Summer (DST): UTC+2 (CEST)
- Postal code: 31010
- Dialing code: 0438
- Patron saint: Santi Pietro e Paolo
- Saint day: 29 giugno
- Website: Official website

Mareno di Piave is a comune (municipality) in the Province of Treviso in the Italian region Veneto, located about 45 kilometres (28 mi) north of Venice and about 20 kilometres (12 mi) northeast of Treviso.

Mareno di Piave borders the following municipalities: Cimadolmo, Codogné, Conegliano, San Vendemiano, Santa Lucia di Piave, Spresiano, Vazzola.

== Demographic evolution ==
As of 31 December 2004, Mareno di Piave had a population of 8,583 and an area of 27.8 square kilometres (10.7 mi^{2}).

The following graph shows the changes in the municipality's population over time.

Historical population

Year	Pop.	±%
1861	?	—
1871	3,140	—
1881	3,494	+11.3%
1901	3,826	+9.5%
1911	4,881	+27.6%

Year	Pop.	±%
1921	5,430	+11.2%
1931	5,810	+7.0%
1936	5,749	−1.0%
1951	5,872	+2.1%
1961	5,929	+1.0%

Year	Pop.	±%
1971	6,313	+6.5%
1981	6,835	+8.3%
1991	7,255	+6.1%
2001	7,870	+8.5%

Source: Data from ISTAT
