= Fontanelle, Veneto =

Fontanelle
- Comune
- Comune di Fontanelle
- Location within Italy Location within Veneto
- Coordinates: 45°50′N 12°28′E
- Country: Italy
- Region: Veneto
- Province: Treviso (TV)
- Frazioni: Fontanellette, Lutrano, Vallonto, Santa Maria del Palù

Government
  - Mayor: Maurina Sessolo

Area
  - Total: 35.5 km^{2} (13.7 sq mi)
- Elevation: 18 m (59 ft)

Population (31 March 2017)
  - Total: 5,758
  - Density: 162/km^{2} (420/sq mi)
- Demonym: Fontanellesi
- Time zone: UTC+1 (CET)
  - Summer (DST): UTC+2 (CEST)
- Postal code: 31043
- Dialing code: 0422
- Website: Official website

Fontanelle is a comune (municipality) in the province of Treviso, in the Italian region of Veneto, located about 45 kilometres (28 mi) north of Venice and about 25 kilometres (16 mi) northeast of Treviso.

Fontanelle borders the following municipalities: Codogné, Gaiarine, Mansuè, Oderzo, Ormelle, San Polo di Piave, Vazzola.

== History ==
=== Origins and Roman age ===
As the name suggests, Fontanelle is an area rich in springs and originally housed a rain forest of oaks.

The oldest human traces consist of a few stone tools that are now preserved at the Museum of Oderzo. Based on these, it is believed that the territory was crossed by Neolithic hunters from Montello.

In Roman times the area was certainly inhabited, given the proximity to municipium of Oderzo and the passage of a direct route to Serravalle. From this period are the remains of pottery, bricks and other material.

=== Middle Ages ===
The importance of Fontanelle grew during the Middle Ages as the seat of a parish under the diocese of Ceneda, and with jurisdiction over the churches of Cimetta Codogné, Fontanellette, and Vallonto Visnà.

In this period the area featured a fraternity of Flagellants, based on that of Oderzo founded in 1313.

According to some sources in Fontanelle was home to a castle, with localization to the north-west of the capital.

== Modern era ==
With the arrival of the Venetian Republic, Fontanelle was confirmed feud of Porcia, themselves vassals of the Patriarchate of Aquileia.

The invasion of the Austro-Hungarian troops took place on November 8, 1917. Il day of liberation was October 31.

== Twin towns ==
Fontanelle is twinned with:

- Auterive, Haute-Garonne, France
