= Ponte di Piave =

- Comune
- Comune di Ponte di Piave
- Coat of arms

- Location within Italy Location within Veneto
- Coordinates: 45°43′N 12°28′E
- Country: Italy
- Region: Veneto
- Province: Treviso (TV)
- Frazioni: Negrisia, Levada, San Nicolò, Busco

Government
  - Mayor: Paola Roma

Area
  - Total: 32.8 km^{2} (12.7 sq mi)
- Elevation: 12 m (39 ft)

Population (31 December 2015)
  - Total: 8,342
  - Density: 254/km^{2} (659/sq mi)
- Demonym: Pontepiavensi
- Time zone: UTC+1 (CET)
  - Summer (DST): UTC+2 (CEST)
- Postal code: 31047
- Dialing code: 0422
- Patron saint: St. Thomas of Canterbury
- Saint day: 29 December
- Website: Official website

Ponte di Piave is a comune (municipality) in the Province of Treviso in the Italian region Veneto, located about 35 kilometres (22 mi) northeast of Venice and about 20 kilometres (12 mi) northeast of Treviso.

Ponte di Piave borders the following municipalities: Breda di Piave, Chiarano, Maserada sul Piave, Oderzo, Ormelle, Salgareda, San Biagio di Callalta.

== Twin towns ==
- Castelginest, France, since 1984

== Notable people ==
- Marcello Bergamo (1946–), Italian cyclist born in Ponte di Piave
- Antonio Gasparinetti (1777–1824), Italian poet and military officer born in Ponte di Piave
- Gino Paro (1910–1988), Italian prelate born in Ponte di Piave
