= Codognè =

- Comune
- Comune di Codognè
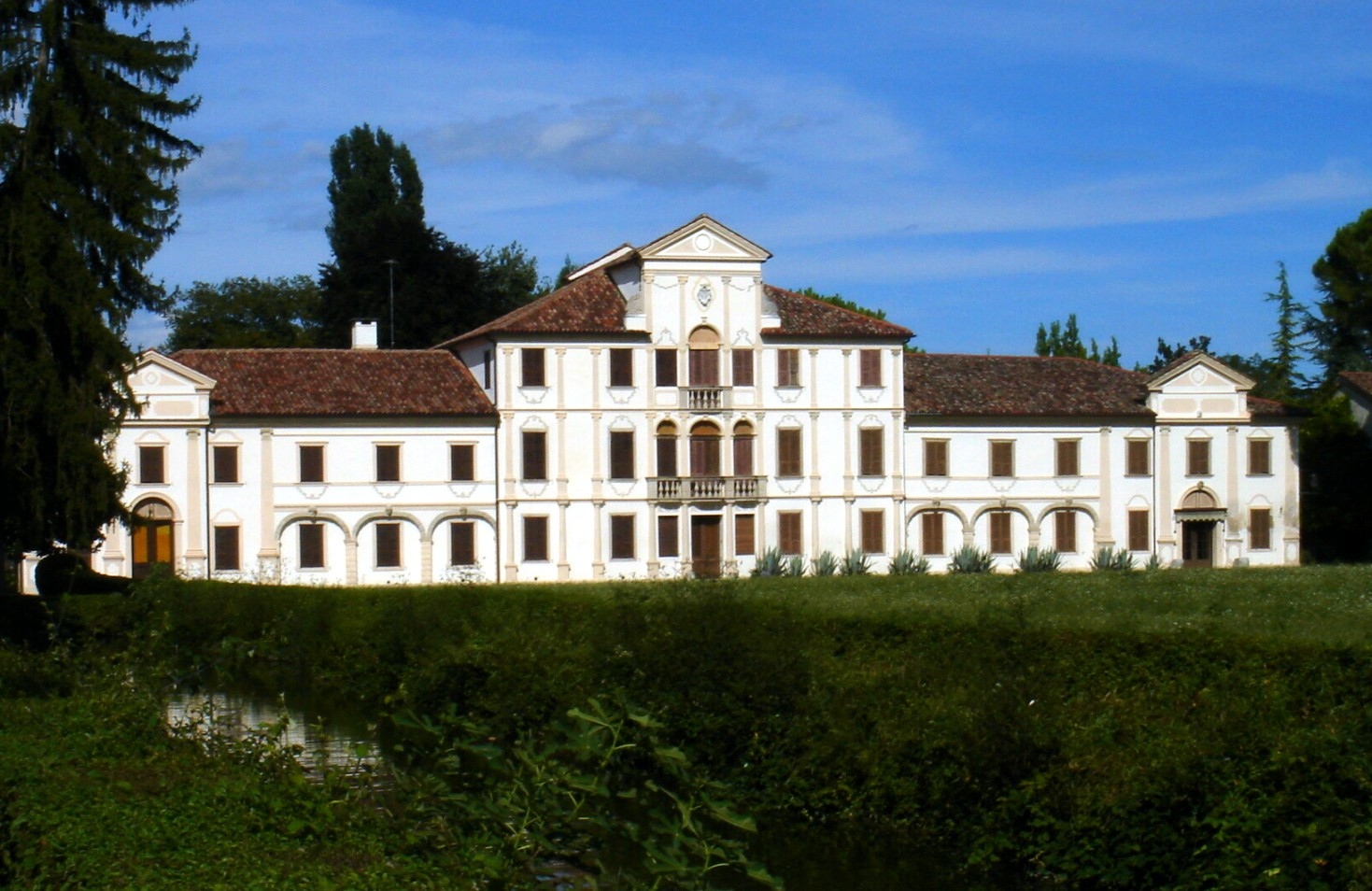
- Villa Toderini

- Location within Italy Location within Veneto
- Coordinates: 45°52′N 12°26′E
- Country: Italy
- Region: Veneto
- Province: Treviso (TV)

Government
  - Mayor: Lisa Tommasella

Area
  - Total: 21.7 km^{2} (8.4 sq mi)
- Elevation: 26 m (85 ft)

Population (30 June 2017)
  - Total: 5,334
  - Density: 246/km^{2} (637/sq mi)
- Demonym: Codognesi
- Time zone: UTC+1 (CET)
  - Summer (DST): UTC+2 (CEST)
- Postal code: 31013
- Dialing code: 0438
- Patron saint: St. Andrew the Apostle
- Saint day: November 30

Codognè (Italian: [kodoɲˈɲɛ]) or Codogné (Italian: [kodoɲˈɲe], Venetian: [kodoˈɲe]) is a comune (municipality) in the Province of Treviso in the Italian region of Veneto, located about 50 kilometres (31 mi) north of Venice and about 25 kilometres (16 mi) northeast of Treviso.

Codognè borders the following municipalities: Fontanelle, Gaiarine, Godega di Sant'Urbano, Mareno di Piave, San Fior, San Vendemiano and Vazzola.
