= Orsago =

- Comune
- Comune di Orsago
- Location within Italy Location within Veneto
- Coordinates: 45°56′N 12°25′E
- Country: Italy
- Region: Veneto
- Province: Province of Treviso (TV)

Area
  - Total: 10.7 km^{2} (4.1 sq mi)
- Elevation: 40 m (130 ft)

Population (Dec. 2004)
  - Total: 3,817
  - Density: 357/km^{2} (924/sq mi)
- Time zone: UTC+1 (CET)
  - Summer (DST): UTC+2 (CEST)
- Postal code: 31010
- Dialing code: 0438
- Website: Official website

Orsago is a comune (municipality) in the province of Treviso, in the Italian region of Veneto, located about 60 kilometres (37 mi) north of Venice and about 30 kilometres (19 mi) northeast of Treviso. As of 31 December 2004, it had a population of 3,817 and an area of 10.7 square kilometres (4.1 mi^{2}).

Orsago borders the following municipalities: Cordignano, Gaiarine, Godega di Sant'Urbano.

Important buildings:

1. Villa Sbrojavacca – Maffei, 18th century. This construction was built by the Sbrojavacca nobles in the 18th century, but presents also some older elements such as the boundary walls surrounding the construction being the first site for cellars and barns, with rectangular openings as a range of loop-holes. The villa was purchased by Maffei Marconi in 1835 and afterwards passed to the Zanin family of Orsago.
2. Villa Priuli – Chastonay, 17th century. By crossing the large entrance gateway, with columns adorned by white stone swirls and statues, and following the pathway, you come upon a second gateway having the statues of Ercole and Prometeo. The villa is majestic, with an elevated central body.

== Demographic evolution ==
Historical population

| Year | Pop. | ±% |
|---|---|---|
| 1861 | ? | — |
| 1871 | 1,642 | — |
| 1881 | 1,706 | +3.9% |
| 1901 | 1,627 | −4.6% |
| 1911 | 2,042 | +25.5% |

| Year | Pop. | ±% |
|---|---|---|
| 1921 | 2,248 | +10.1% |
| 1931 | 2,483 | +10.5% |
| 1936 | 2,554 | +2.9% |
| 1951 | 2,649 | +3.7% |
| 1961 | 2,946 | +11.2% |

| Year | Pop. | ±% |
|---|---|---|
| 1971 | 3,384 | +14.9% |
| 1981 | 3,516 | +3.9% |
| 1991 | 3,556 | +1.1% |
| 2001 | 3,598 | +1.2% |

Source: Data from ISTAT
