= Spresiano =

- Comune
- Comune di Spresiano
- Location within Italy Location within Veneto
- Coordinates: 45°47′N 12°15′E
- Country: Italy
- Region: Veneto
- Province: Province of Treviso (TV)
- Frazioni: Spresiano, Lovadina e Visnadello

Area
  - Total: 25.6 km^{2} (9.9 sq mi)

Population (Dec. 2024)
  - Total: 12,389
  - Density: 484/km^{2} (1,250/sq mi)
- Demonym: Spresianesi
- Time zone: UTC+1 (CET)
  - Summer (DST): UTC+2 (CEST)
- Postal code: 31027
- Dialing code: 0422
- Website: Official website

Spresiano is a comune (municipality) in the Province of Treviso in the Italian region Veneto, located about 40 kilometres (25 mi) north of Venice and about 13 kilometres (8 mi) north of Treviso. As of 31 December 2024, it had a population of 12,389 and an area of 25.6 square kilometres (9.9 mi^{2}).

The municipality of Spresiano contains the frazioni (subdivisions, mainly villages and hamlets) Spresiano, Lovadina and Visnadello.

Spresiano borders the following municipalities: Arcade, Carbonera, Cimadolmo, Mareno di Piave, Maserada sul Piave, Nervesa della Battaglia, Santa Lucia di Piave, Susegana, Villorba.

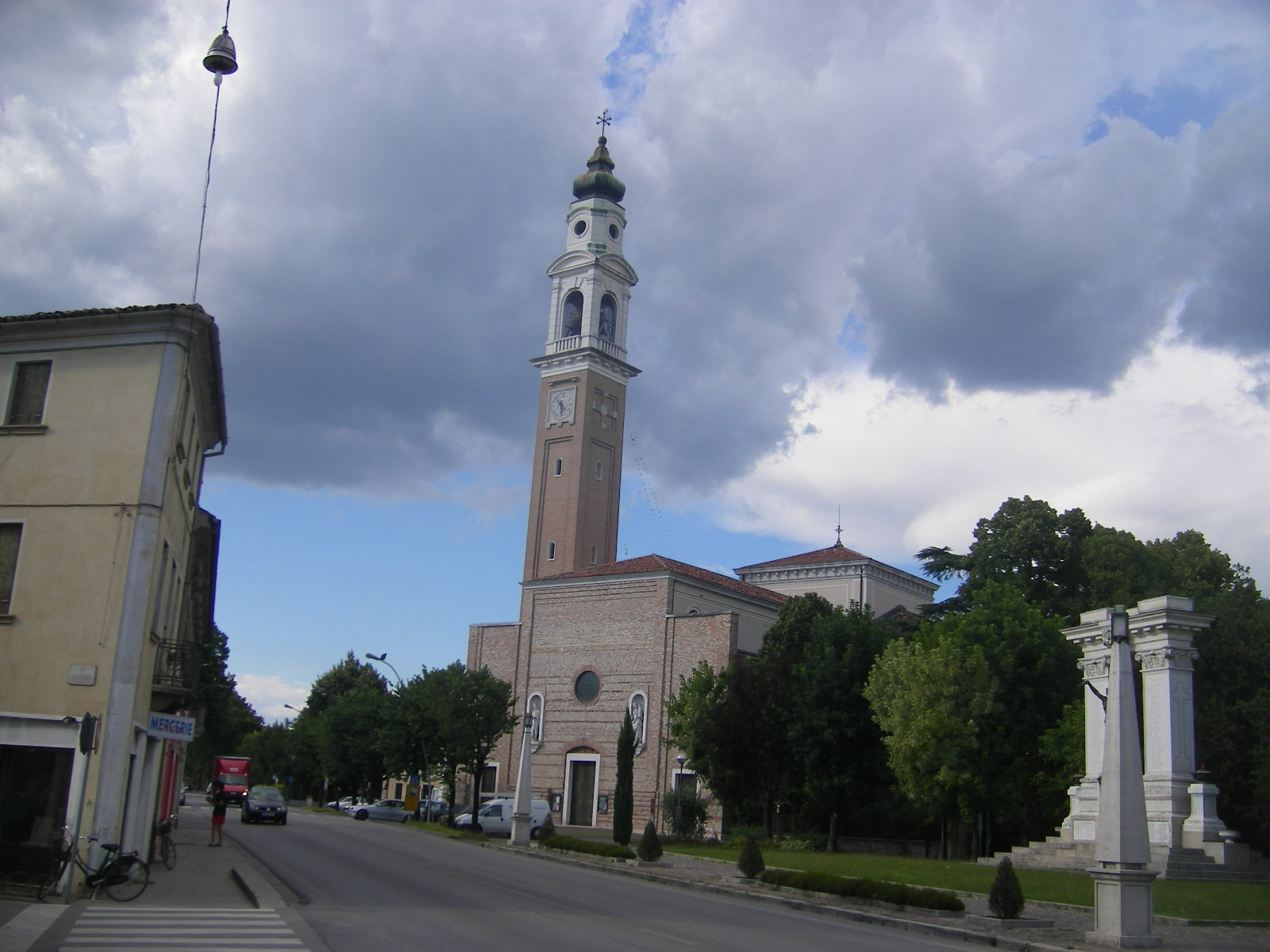
The Archpriest's Church

== Monuments and places of interest ==
- Church of the Holy Trinity (Spresiano)

In 1918 the church was bombed and destroyed. The current parish church was built in 1925, with compensation from the State and designed by the architect Lorenzo Rinaldo.

The Archpriest's Church is in Renaissance style and preserves the artistic works that remained intact during the First World War, namely two small paintings attributed to Pordenone (16th century), already incorporated into the destroyed contemporary high altar, rich in wooden sculptures; the 19th century altarpieces of the Virgin of the Rosary (L. Gavagnin), of Saint Anthony (G.A. De Lorenzi), and of the Crucifix (L. Querena).

== Demographic evolution ==
Historical population

Year	Pop.	±%
1861	?	—
1871	3,716	—
1881	3,958	+6.5%
1901	4,699	+18.7%
1911	6,426	+36.8%
1921	6,365	−0.9%

Year	Pop.	±%
1931	6,086	−4.4%
1936	6,119	+0.5%
1951	6,814	+11.4%
1961	7,011	+2.9%
1971	7,914	+12.9%
1981	8,652	+9.3%

Year	Pop.	±%
1991	8,658	+0.1%
2001	9,251	+6.8%
2011	11,666	+26.1%
2021	12,298	+5.4%

Source: Data from ISTAT

=== Foreign ethnicities and minorities ===
As of December 31, 2023, foreigners residents in the municipality were 1,543, i.e. 12.5% of the population. The largest groups are shown below:

1. Romania 359
2. Morocco 224
3. China 174
4. Albania 132
5. Kosovo 84
