= San Polo di Piave =

- Comune
- Comune di San Polo di Piave
- Location within Italy Location within Veneto
- Coordinates: 45°47′26″N 12°23′39″E
- Country: Italy
- Region: Veneto
- Province: Treviso (TV)
- Frazioni: Rai

Area
  - Total: 20.9 km^{2} (8.1 sq mi)

Population (Dec. 2004)
  - Total: 4,845
  - Density: 232/km^{2} (600/sq mi)
- Demonym: Sanpolesi
- Time zone: UTC+1 (CET)
  - Summer (DST): UTC+2 (CEST)
- Postal code: 31020
- Dialing code: 0422
- Website: Official website

San Polo di Piave is a comune (municipality) in the Province of Treviso in the Italian region Veneto, located about 40 kilometres (25 mi) north of Venice and about 15 kilometres (9 mi) northeast of Treviso. As of 31 December 2004, it had a population of 4,845 and an area of 20.9 square kilometres (8.1 mi^{2}).

The municipality of San Polo di Piave contains the frazione (subdivision) Rai and San Giorgio, best known for a picturesque Catholic church built in 1200.

San Polo di Piave borders the following municipalities: Cimadolmo, Fontanelle, Ormelle, Vazzola.

== Demographic evolution ==
Historical population

Year	Pop.	±%
1861	?	—
1871	2,761	—
1881	3,008	+8.9%
1901	3,116	+3.6%
1911	4,056	+30.2%

Year	Pop.	±%
1921	4,423	+9.0%
1931	4,699	+6.2%
1936	4,670	−0.6%
1951	4,701	+0.7%
1961	4,044	−14.0%

Year	Pop.	±%
1971	3,766	−6.9%
1981	3,812	+1.2%
1991	4,053	+6.3%
2001	4,536	+11.9%

Source: Data from ISTAT
