= Vazzola =

- Comune
- Comune di Vazzola
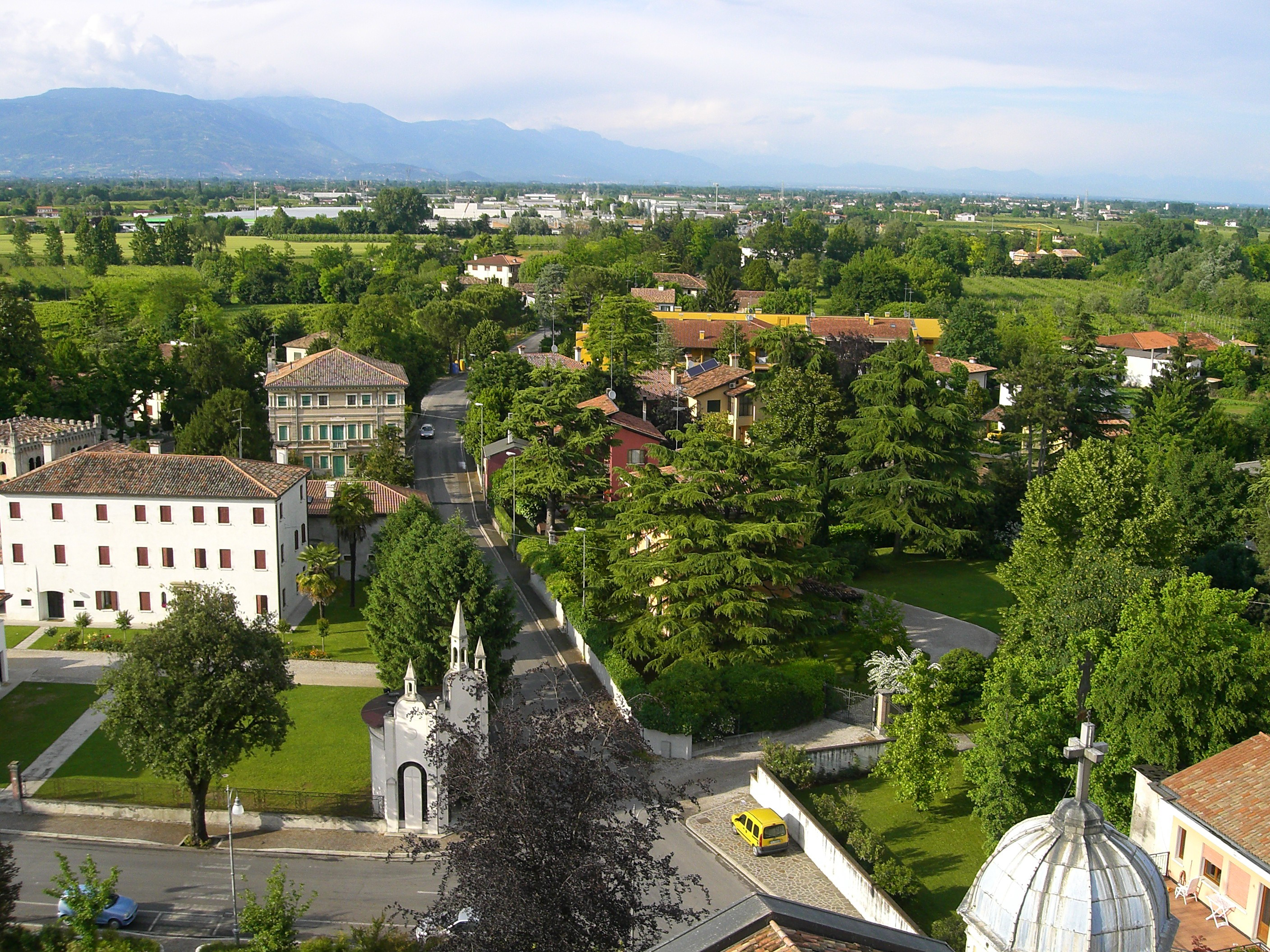

- Location within Italy Location within Veneto
- Coordinates: 45°50′N 12°23′E
- Country: Italy
- Region: Veneto
- Province: Treviso (TV)
- Frazioni: Visnà, Tezze di Piave

Government
  - Mayor: Pierina Cescon

Area
  - Total: 26.16 km^{2} (10.10 sq mi)
- Elevation: 30 m (98 ft)

Population (31-3-2022)
  - Total: 6,749
  - Density: 258.0/km^{2} (668.2/sq mi)
- Demonym: Vazzolesi
- Time zone: UTC+1 (CET)
  - Summer (DST): UTC+2 (CEST)
- Postal code: 31028
- Dialing code: 0438
- Website: Official website

Vazzola is a comune (municipality) in the Province of Treviso, in the Italian region of Veneto, located about 45 kilometres (28 mi) north of Venice and about 20 kilometres (12 mi) northeast of Treviso.

Vazzola borders the following municipalities: Cimadolmo, Codogné, Fontanelle, Mareno di Piave and San Polo di Piave.
