= San Fior =

- Comune
- Comune di San Fior
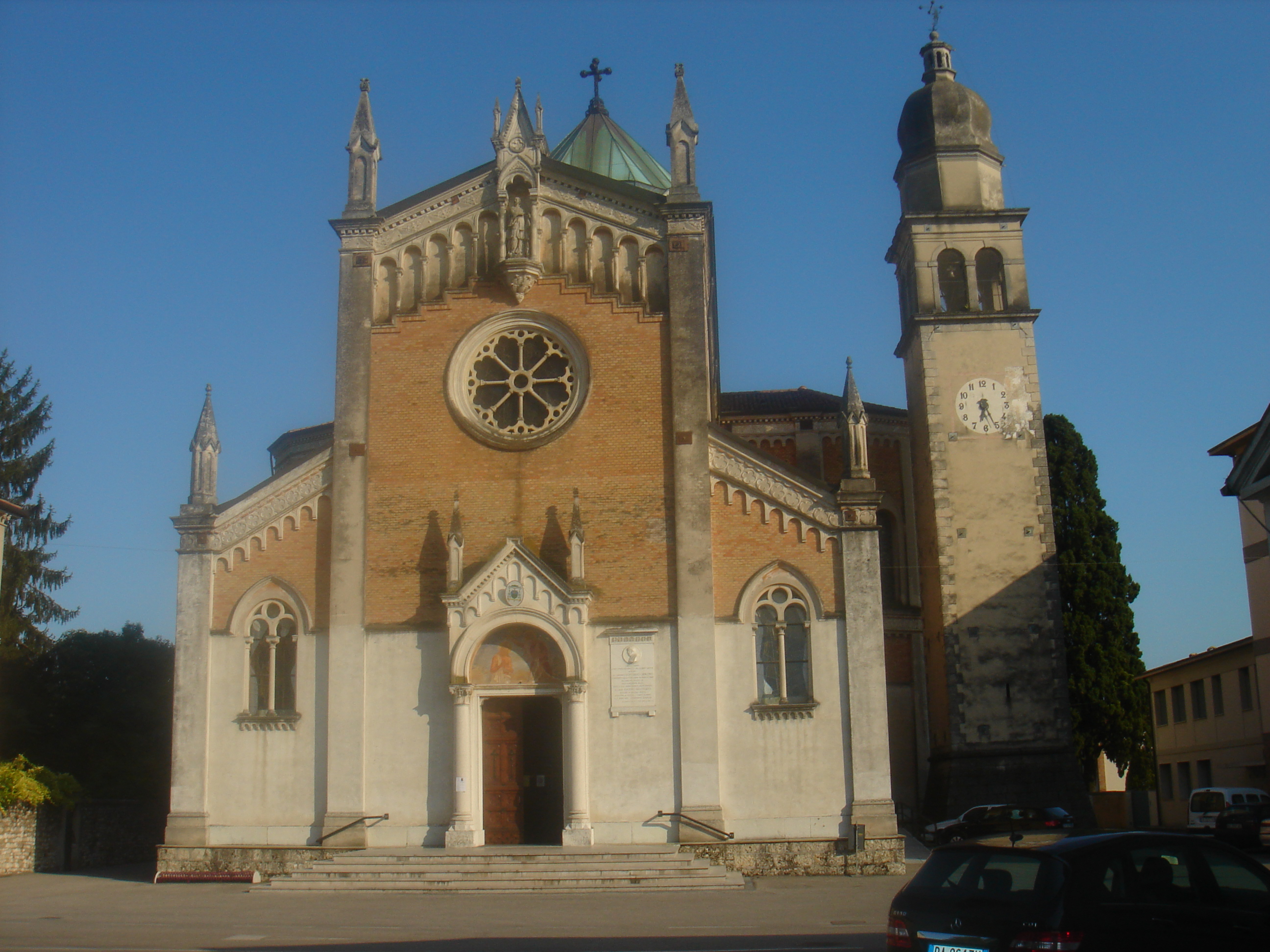
- Church in San Fior

- Coat of arms

- Location within Italy Location within Veneto
- Coordinates: 45°54′N 12°23′E
- Country: Italy
- Region: Veneto
- Province: Province of Treviso (TV)

Area
  - Total: 17.8 km^{2} (6.9 sq mi)

Population (Dec. 2004)
  - Total: 6,357
  - Density: 357/km^{2} (925/sq mi)
- Demonym: Sanfioresi
- Time zone: UTC+1 (CET)
  - Summer (DST): UTC+2 (CEST)
- Postal code: 31020
- Dialing code: 0438

San Fior is a comune (municipality) in the Province of Treviso in the Italian region Veneto, located about 50 kilometres (31 mi) north of Venice and about 30 kilometres (19 mi) northeast of Treviso. As of 31 December 2004, it had a population of 6,357 and an area of 17.8 square kilometres (6.9 mi^{2}).

San Fior borders the following municipalities: Codogné, Colle Umberto, Conegliano, Godega di Sant'Urbano, San Vendemiano.

== Frazioni ==
San Fior is divided into three villages: the principal town is San Fior (or San Fior di Sopra); the south frazione is San Fior di Sotto and the north frazione is Castello Roganzuolo.

== Demographic evolution ==
Historical population

Year	Pop.	±%
1861	?	—
1871	2,676	—
1881	2,845	+6.3%
1901	3,329	+17.0%
1911	3,860	+16.0%

Year	Pop.	±%
1921	4,347	+12.6%
1931	4,440	+2.1%
1936	4,400	−0.9%
1951	4,581	+4.1%
1961	4,855	+6.0%

Year	Pop.	±%
1971	5,121	+5.5%
1981	5,475	+6.9%
1991	5,467	−0.1%
2001	6,153	+12.5%

Source: Data from ISTAT

== Twin towns ==
San Fior is twinned with:

- Colayrac-Saint-Cirq, France
