= Gaiarine =

- Comune
- Comune di Gaiarine
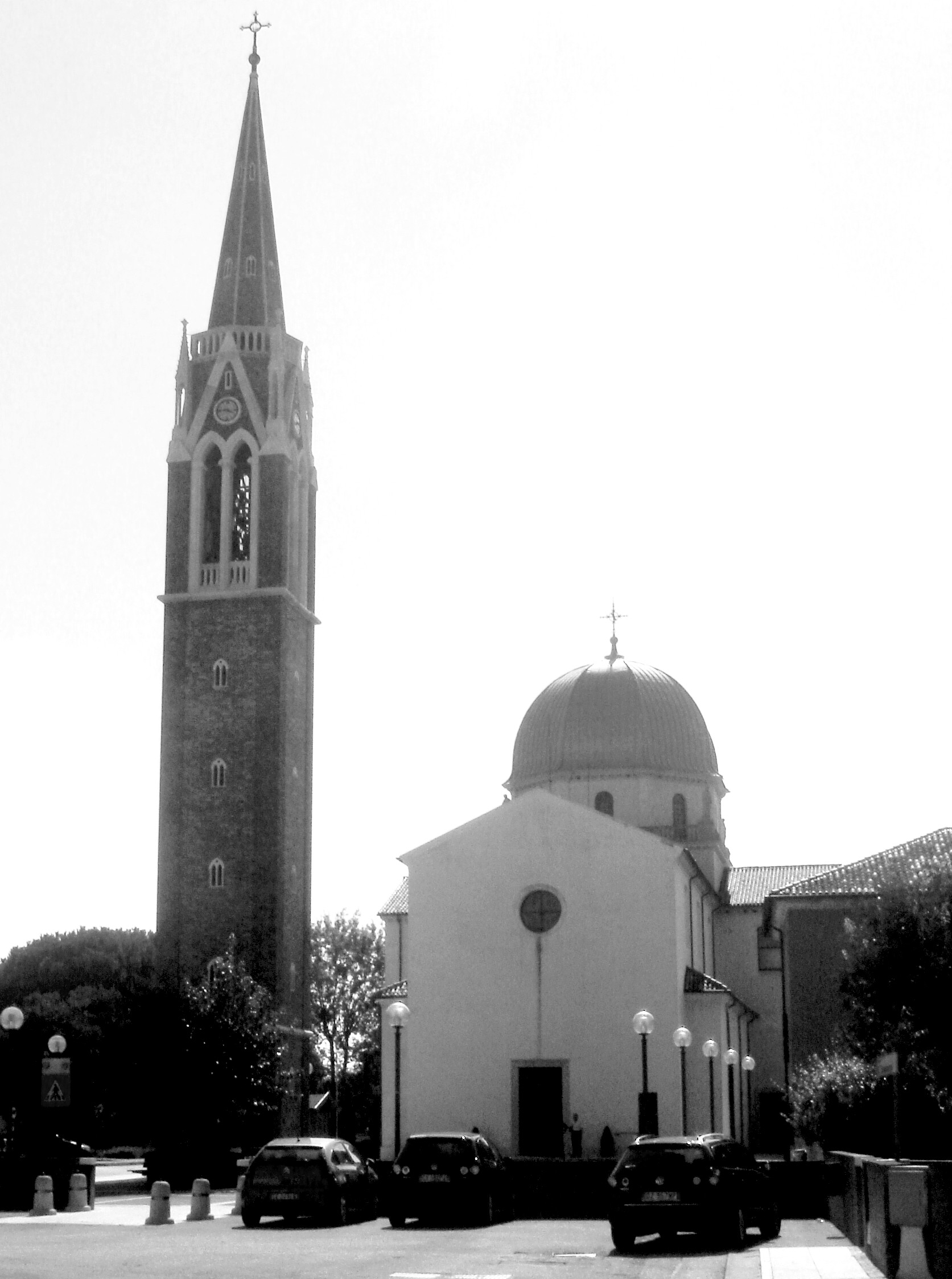
- Parish church

- Location within Italy Location within Veneto
- Coordinates: 45°53′N 12°29′E
- Country: Italy
- Region: Veneto
- Province: Treviso (TV)

Government
  - Mayor: Diego Zanchetta

Area
  - Total: 28.7 km^{2} (11.1 sq mi)
- Elevation: 20 m (66 ft)

Population (31 March 2017)
  - Total: 6,053
  - Density: 211/km^{2} (546/sq mi)
- Demonym: Gaiarinesi
- Time zone: UTC+1 (CET)
  - Summer (DST): UTC+2 (CEST)
- Postal code: 31018
- Dialing code: 0434
- Website: Official website

Gaiarine is a comune (municipality) in the province of Treviso, in the Italian region of Veneto, about 50 kilometres (31 mi) north of Venice and about 30 kilometres (19 mi) northeast of Treviso.

Gaiarine borders these municipalities: Brugnera, Codogné, Cordignano, Fontanelle, Godega di Sant'Urbano, Mansuè, Orsago, Portobuffolé, Sacile. Its hamlets are Francenigo, Albina, Campomolino and Calderano.
