= Brugnera =

Brugnera Brugnere (Friulian)
- Comune
- Comune di Brugnera
- Coat of arms

- Location within Italy Location within Friuli-Venezia Giulia
- Coordinates: 45°54′N 12°32′E
- Country: Italy
- Region: Friuli-Venezia Giulia
- Province: Pordenone (PN)
- Frazioni: Maron, Tamai, San Cassiano di Livenza

Government
  - Mayor: Renzo Dolfi

Area
  - Total: 29.2 km^{2} (11.3 sq mi)
- Elevation: 16 m (52 ft)

Population (31 December 2014)
  - Total: 9,387
  - Density: 321/km^{2} (833/sq mi)
- Demonym: Brugneresi
- Time zone: UTC+1 (CET)
  - Summer (DST): UTC+2 (CEST)
- Postal code: 33070
- Dialing code: 0434
- Website: Official website

Brugnera (Friulian: Brugnere) is a comune (municipality) in the Regional decentralization entity of Pordenone, in the Italian region of Friuli-Venezia Giulia, located about 100 kilometres (62 mi) northwest of Trieste and about 12 kilometres (7 mi) southwest of Pordenone, with about 9,000 inhabitants.

The municipality of Brugnera contains the frazioni (boroughs) Maron, Tamai and San Cassiano di Livenza.

Brugnera borders the following municipalities: Fontanafredda, Gaiarine, Porcia, Portobuffolé, Prata di Pordenone, Sacile.
