= Godega di Sant'Urbano =

Godega di Sant'Urbano Gódega (Venetian)
- Comune
- Comune di Godega di Sant'Urbano
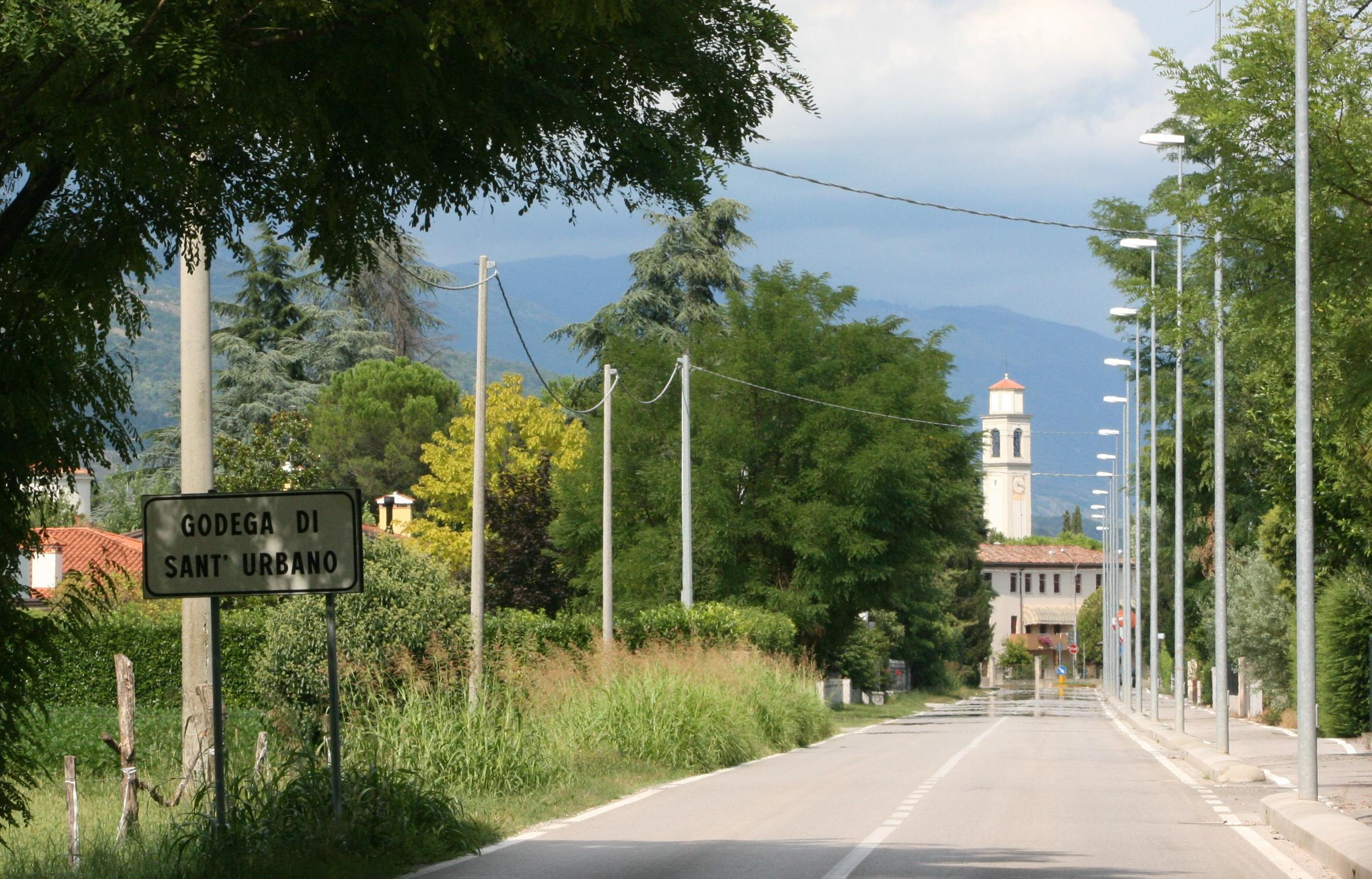
- Town's entrance; in background the bell tower

- Godega within the Province of Treviso

- Location within Italy Location within Veneto
- Coordinates: 45°56′N 12°24′E
- Country: Italy
- Region: Veneto
- Province: Treviso (TV)
- Frazioni: Bibano, Pianzano

Government
  - Mayor: Paola Guzzo

Area
  - Total: 24.3 km^{2} (9.4 sq mi)
- Elevation: 52 m (171 ft)

Population (31 March 2017)
  - Total: 6,033
  - Density: 248/km^{2} (643/sq mi)
- Demonym: Godigesi
- Time zone: UTC+1 (CET)
  - Summer (DST): UTC+2 (CEST)
- Postal code: 31010
- Dialing code: 0438
- Website: www.comunegodega.tv.it

Godega di Sant'Urbano (Italian: [ˈɡoːdeɡa di santurˈbaːno]), also known simply as Godega (Venetian: Gódega [ˈɡodeɡa]), is a comune (municipality) in the province of Treviso, in the Italian region of Veneto, located about 60 kilometres (37 mi) north of Venice and about 30 kilometres (19 mi) northeast of Treviso.

Godega di Sant'Urbano borders the following municipalities: Codogné, Colle Umberto, Cordignano, Gaiarine, Orsago, San Fior.

== Twin towns ==
Godega di Sant'Urbano is twinned with:

- L'Isle-en-Dodon, France, since 2006
