= Colle Umberto =

Colle Umberto Cołe Unberto
- Comune
- Comune di Colle Umberto
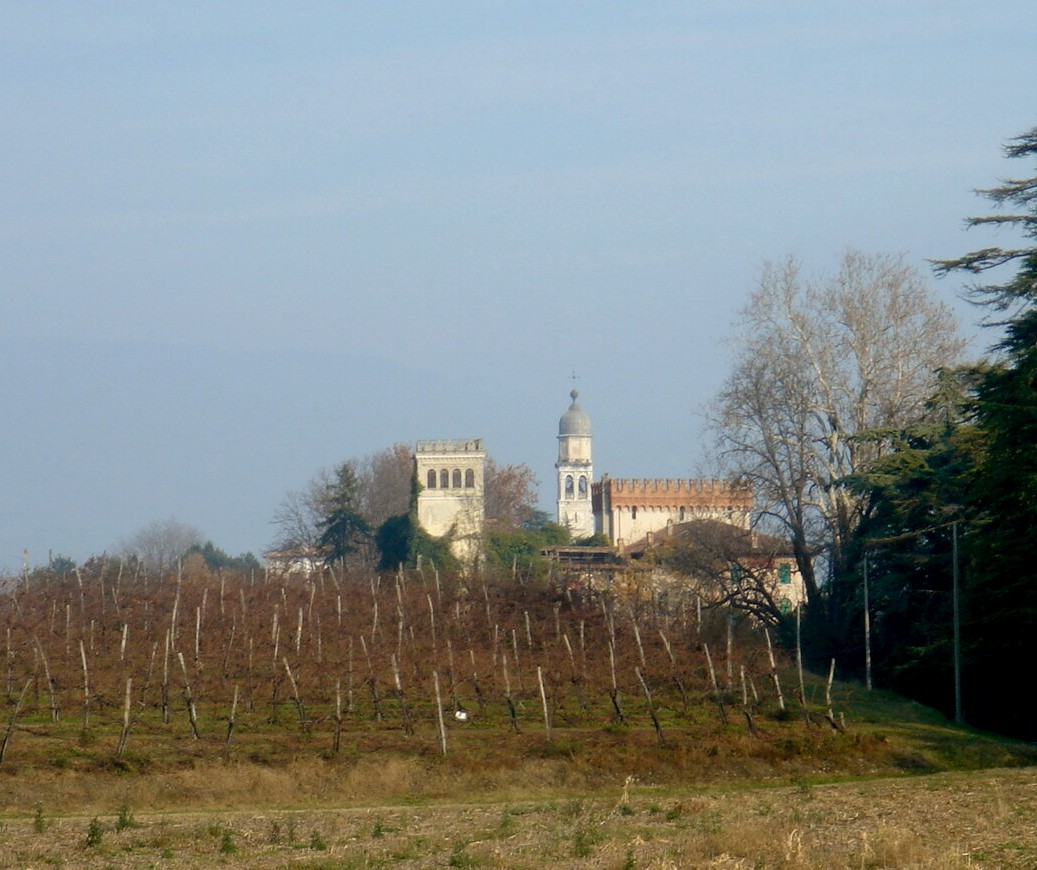
- View with campanile and Lucheschi Castle

- Location within Italy Location within Veneto
- Coordinates: 45°57′N 12°21′E
- Country: Italy
- Region: Veneto
- Province: Treviso (TV)
- Frazioni: San Martino di Colle Umberto telephone = 0438

Government
  - Mayor: Sebastiano Coletti

Area
  - Total: 13.6 km^{2} (5.3 sq mi)
- Elevation: 144 m (472 ft)

Population (30 June 2017)
  - Total: 5,081
  - Density: 374/km^{2} (968/sq mi)
- Demonym: Collumbertesi
- Time zone: UTC+1 (CET)
  - Summer (DST): UTC+2 (CEST)
- Postal code: 31014
- Website: Official website

Colle Umberto (Venetian: Cołe Unberto) is a comune (municipality) in the Province of Treviso in the Italian region Veneto, located about 60 kilometres (37 mi) north of Venice and about 30 kilometres (19 mi) north of Treviso.

Colle Umberto borders the following municipalities: Cappella Maggiore, Conegliano, Cordignano, Godega di Sant'Urbano, San Fior, Vittorio Veneto.

The town's most visited place is the Villa Verecondi Scortecci owned by an old upper-class Venetian family.

== San Martino ==
The frazione of San Martino was the birthplace of Ottavio Bottecchia, the first Italian to win the Tour de France in both 1924 and 1925, but he died mysteriously at the height of career during a training ride in Friuli, at Trasaghis. There is a local move to create a museum to him.

== Twin towns ==
The town is twinned with the following:

- (Malta) San Lawrenz, Gozo.
- La Balme-de-Sillingy, France
