= Portobuffolé =

Portobuffolé Portobufołé (Venetian)
- Comune
- Comune di Portobuffolé
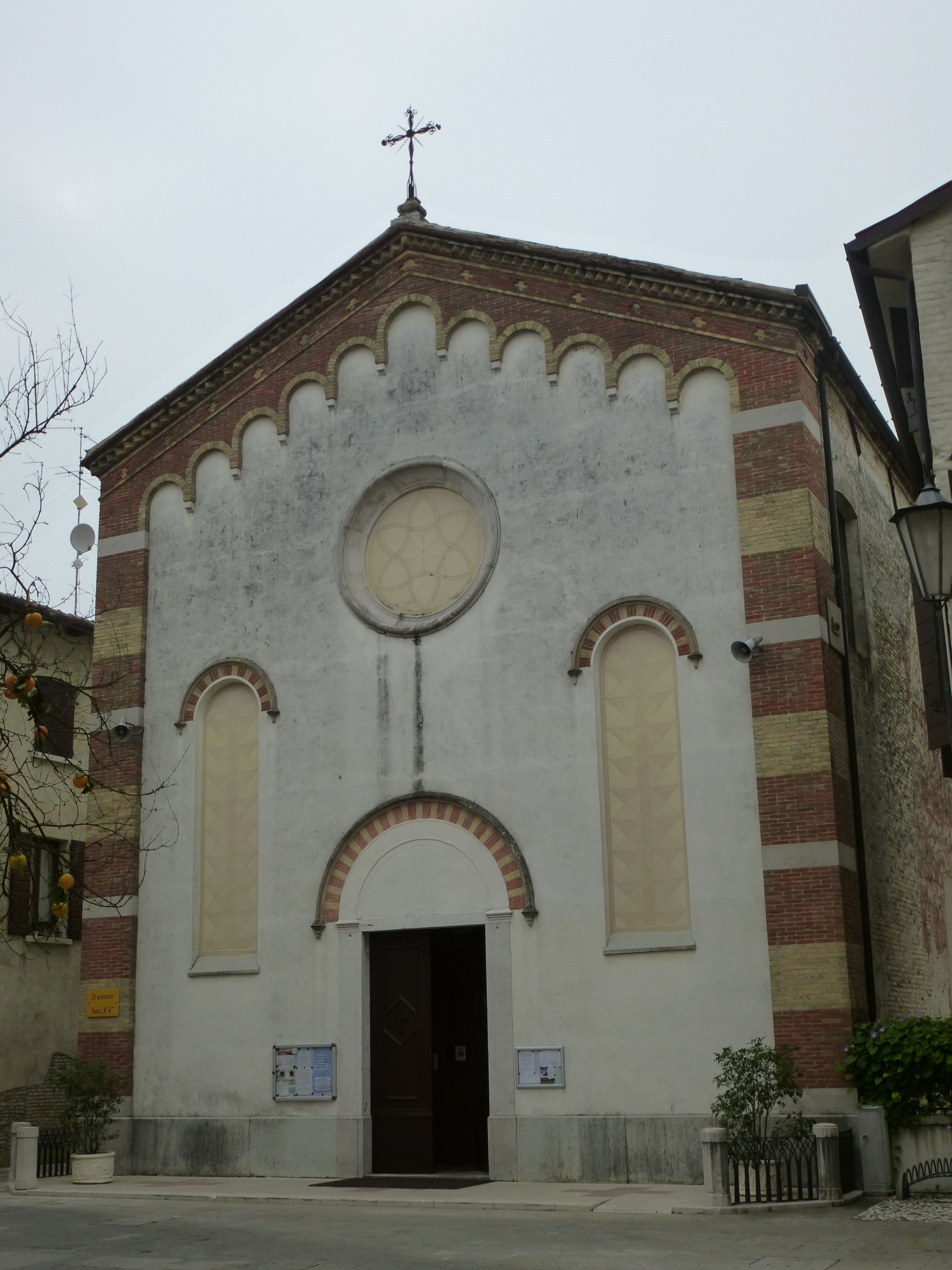
- The Cathedral

- Coat of arms

- Location within Italy Location within Veneto
- Coordinates: 45°51′N 12°32′E
- Country: Italy
- Region: Veneto
- Province: Treviso (TV)
- Frazioni: Settimo, Ronche and Faé

Government
  - Mayor: Andrea Sebastiano Susana

Area
  - Total: 5.0 km^{2} (1.9 sq mi)
- Elevation: 10 m (33 ft)

Population (31 December 2015)
  - Total: 755
  - Density: 150/km^{2} (390/sq mi)
- Demonym: Portobuffolesi or Portuensi
- Time zone: UTC+1 (CET)
  - Summer (DST): UTC+2 (CEST)
- Postal code: 31040
- Dialing code: 0422
- Website: Official website

Portobuffolé (Italian: [ˌpɔrtobuffoˈle]) or less correctly Portobuffolè (Italian: [ˌpɔrtobuffoˈlɛ]) (Venetian: Portobufołé) is a comune (municipality) in the province of Treviso, in the Italian region of Veneto, located about 50 kilometres (31 mi) northeast of Venice and about 30 kilometres (19 mi) northeast of Treviso on both the shores of the Livenza river.

Portobuffolé borders the following municipalities: Brugnera, Gaiarine, Mansuè, Prata di Pordenone. Sights include the Duomo, a synagogue re-consecrated in 1559. During the Middle Ages the town, of Roman origins, was under the da Carrara, the patriarchs of Aquileia, the bishops of Ceneda, the comune of Treviso (1166) and then again under the bishops of Ceneda (1242). After a period of da Camino suzerainty (1307–36), it became part of the Republic of Venice since 1339. Portobuffolé is one of I Borghi più belli d'Italia ("The most beautiful villages of Italy").
