= Resana =

Resana Rexana
- Comune
- Comune di Resana
- Location within Italy Location within Veneto
- Coordinates: 45°38′N 11°57′E
- Country: Italy
- Region: Veneto
- Province: Province of Treviso (TV)
- Frazioni: Castelminio, San Marco

Area
  - Total: 25.0 km^{2} (9.7 sq mi)

Population (Dec. 2004)
  - Total: 8,186
  - Density: 327/km^{2} (848/sq mi)
- Demonym: Resanesi
- Time zone: UTC+1 (CET)
  - Summer (DST): UTC+2 (CEST)
- Postal code: 31023
- Dialing code: 0423
- Website: Official website

Resana (Venetian: Rexana) is a comune (municipality) in the Province of Treviso in the Italian region Veneto, located about 35 kilometres (22 mi) northwest of Venice and about 25 kilometres (16 mi) west of Treviso. As of 31 December 2004, it had a population of 8,186 and an area of 25.0 square kilometres (9.7 mi^{2}).

The municipality of Resana contains the frazioni (subdivisions, mainly villages and hamlets) Castelminio and San Marco. Castelminio used to be known as Brusaporco.

Resana borders the following municipalities: Castelfranco Veneto, Loreggia, Piombino Dese, Vedelago.

== Demographic evolution ==
Historical population

Year	Pop.	±%
1861	?	—
1871	4,005	—
1881	4,116	+2.8%
1901	4,258	+3.4%
1911	5,457	+28.2%

Year	Pop.	±%
1921	6,114	+12.0%
1931	5,948	−2.7%
1936	5,882	−1.1%
1951	5,974	+1.6%
1961	5,345	−10.5%

Year	Pop.	±%
1971	5,345	+0.0%
1981	5,943	+11.2%
1991	6,410	+7.9%
2001	7,491	+16.9%

Source: Data from ISTAT

== Twin towns ==
Resana is twinned with:

- Montville, Seine-Maritime, France, since 2008
- Hamilton, Ontario, Canada
