= Mansuè =

- Comune
- Comune di Mansuè
- Location within Italy Location within Veneto
- Coordinates: 45°49′N 12°32′E
- Country: Italy
- Region: Veneto
- Province: Treviso (TV)

Government
  - Mayor: Leonio Milan

Area
  - Total: 26.9 km^{2} (10.4 sq mi)
- Elevation: 13 m (43 ft)

Population (31 December 2015)
  - Total: 5,008
  - Density: 186/km^{2} (482/sq mi)
- Demonym: Mansuetani
- Time zone: UTC+1 (CET)
  - Summer (DST): UTC+2 (CEST)
- Postal code: 31040
- Dialing code: 0422
- Website: Official website

Mansuè is a comune (municipality) in the province of Treviso, in the Italian region of Veneto, located about 45 kilometres (28 mi) northeast of Venice and about 30 kilometres (19 mi) northeast of Treviso.

Mansuè borders the following municipalities: Fontanelle, Gaiarine, Gorgo al Monticano, Oderzo, Pasiano di Pordenone, Portobuffolé, Prata di Pordenone.
