= Chiarano =

- Comune
- Comune di Chiarano
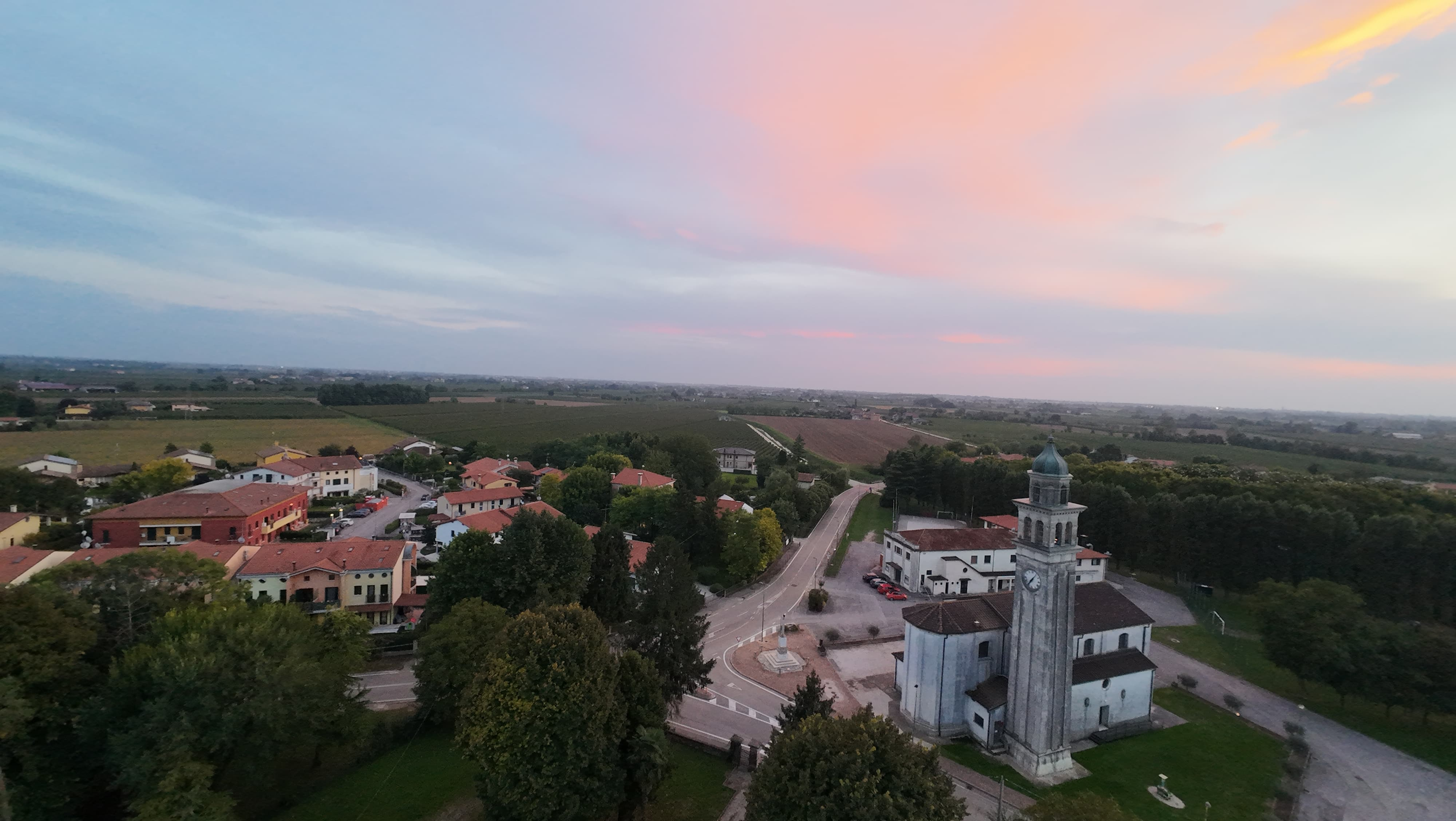
- View of Fossalta Maggiore, a frazione of Chiarano

- Coat of arms

- Location within Italy Location within Veneto
- Coordinates: 45°44′N 12°35′E
- Country: Italy
- Region: Veneto
- Province: Treviso (TV)
- Frazioni: Fossalta Maggiore

Government
  - Mayor: Lorena Rocco

Area
  - Total: 19 km^{2} (7.3 sq mi)
- Elevation: 6 m (20 ft)

Population (30 June 2017)
  - Total: 3,702
  - Density: 190/km^{2} (500/sq mi)
- Demonym: Chiaranesi
- Time zone: UTC+1 (CET)
  - Summer (DST): UTC+2 (CEST)
- Postal code: 31040
- Dialing code: 0422
- Patron saint: St. Bartholomew
- Saint day: 24 August
- Website: Official website

Chiarano is a comune (municipality) in the province of Treviso, in the Italian region of Veneto. It was part of the Venetian Republic until 1797, when the Republic was extinguished.
