= Province of Treviso =

Province of Italy, located in the Veneto region

Coordinates: 45°40′20″N 12°14′32″E

Province of Treviso Provincia di Treviso (Italian) Provincia de Trevixo (Venetian)
- Province
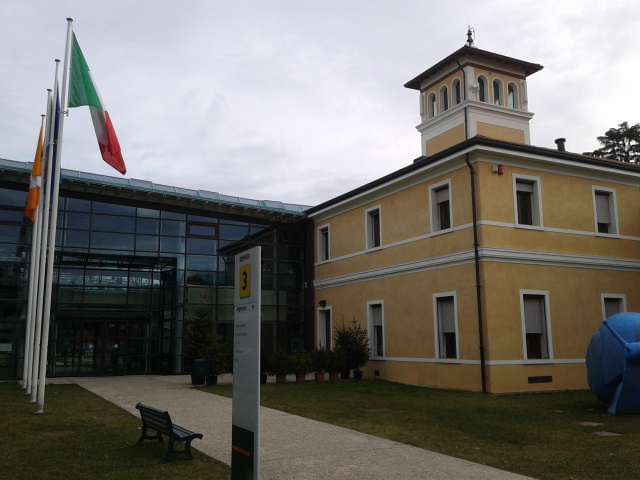
- The provincial seat

- Flag Coat of arms

- Location of the province of Treviso in Italy
- Country: Italy
- Region: Veneto
- Capital(s): Treviso
- Municipalities: 94

Government
  - President: Marco Donadel (Liga Veneta–Lega)

Area
  - Total: 2,479.83 km^{2} (957.47 sq mi)

Population (2026)
  - Total: 878,341
  - Density: 354.194/km^{2} (917.358/sq mi)

GDP
  - Total: €26.867 billion (2015)
  - Per capita: €30,311 (2015)
- Time zone: UTC+1 (CET)
  - Summer (DST): UTC+2 (CEST)
- Postal code: 31100, 31010-31023, 31025-31040, 31043-31059
- Telephone prefix: 0421, 0422, 0423, 0438
- Vehicle registration: TV
- ISTAT code: 026
- Website: www.provincia.treviso.it

The province of Treviso (Italian: provincia di Treviso, Venetian: Provincia de Trevixo) is a province in the region of Veneto in northern Italy. Its capital is the city of Treviso. It has a population of 878,341 in an area of 2,479.83 square kilometres (957.47 sq mi) across its 94 municipalities.

The current President of Treviso province is Marco Donadel, elected in February 2026. He is also the current mayor of Roncade.

The province is surrounded by Belluno in the north, Vicenza in the west, Padua in southwest, Venice in the south-east and Friuli-Venezia Giulia in the east.

== History ==
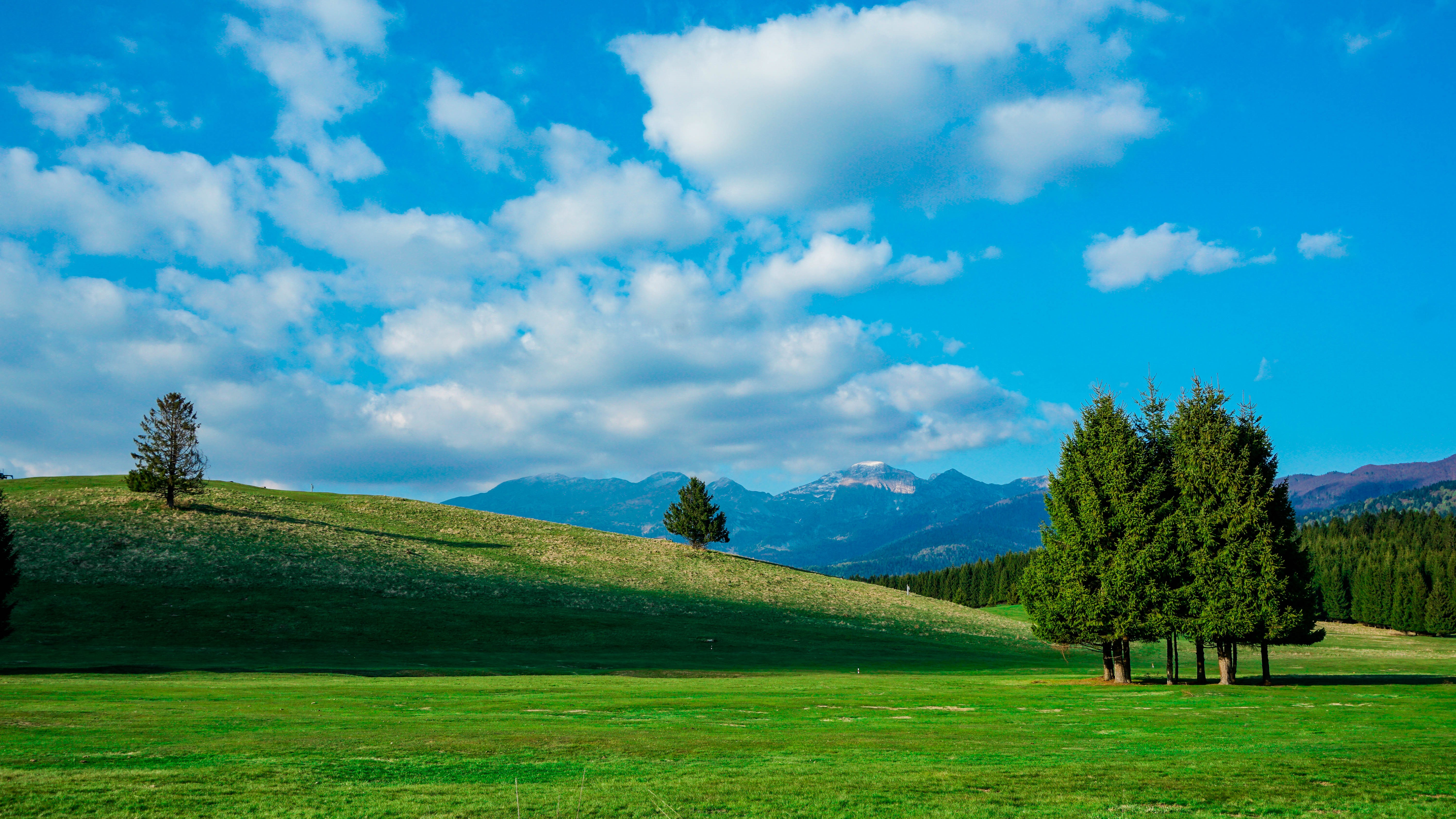
Cansiglio forest

The province of Treviso was established by the Celts but later was flourished under the Romans, in which they had their own district when it became a Municipium, before it was subjugated to Hun, Ostrogoth and Lombard control. Over time, political power was replaced by ecclesiastical authority, and Treviso was divided into two dioceses around 1000 AD. It evolved into a county, municipality and, later, a lordship. In the late 1300s, Treviso fell under the rule of the Republic of Venice and was divided into various regiments and feudal territories, yet it maintained its unity under the podestà of Treviso.

During the 18th and 19th centuries, the region went through changes with the fall of Venice to France in 1797, then Austria, and back to France again. It was finally organized into departments, districts and municipalities under French and Austrian rule. After several transitions, the territory was reorganized and, in 1816, it became the new province of Treviso within the Kingdom of Lombardy–Venetia with ten districts. At the top of the government stood the provincial delegation, supported by the provincial congregation, with advisory functions. This situation was interrupted by the interlude of 1848 when the Republic of San Marco was established: during that brief period, a provisional central government was formed, along with a committee for each district. In 1853, there was a new reorganization of the system, with the abolition of the districts of Motta and Ceneda. This territorial organization remained largely unchanged until the 20th century.

== Geography ==
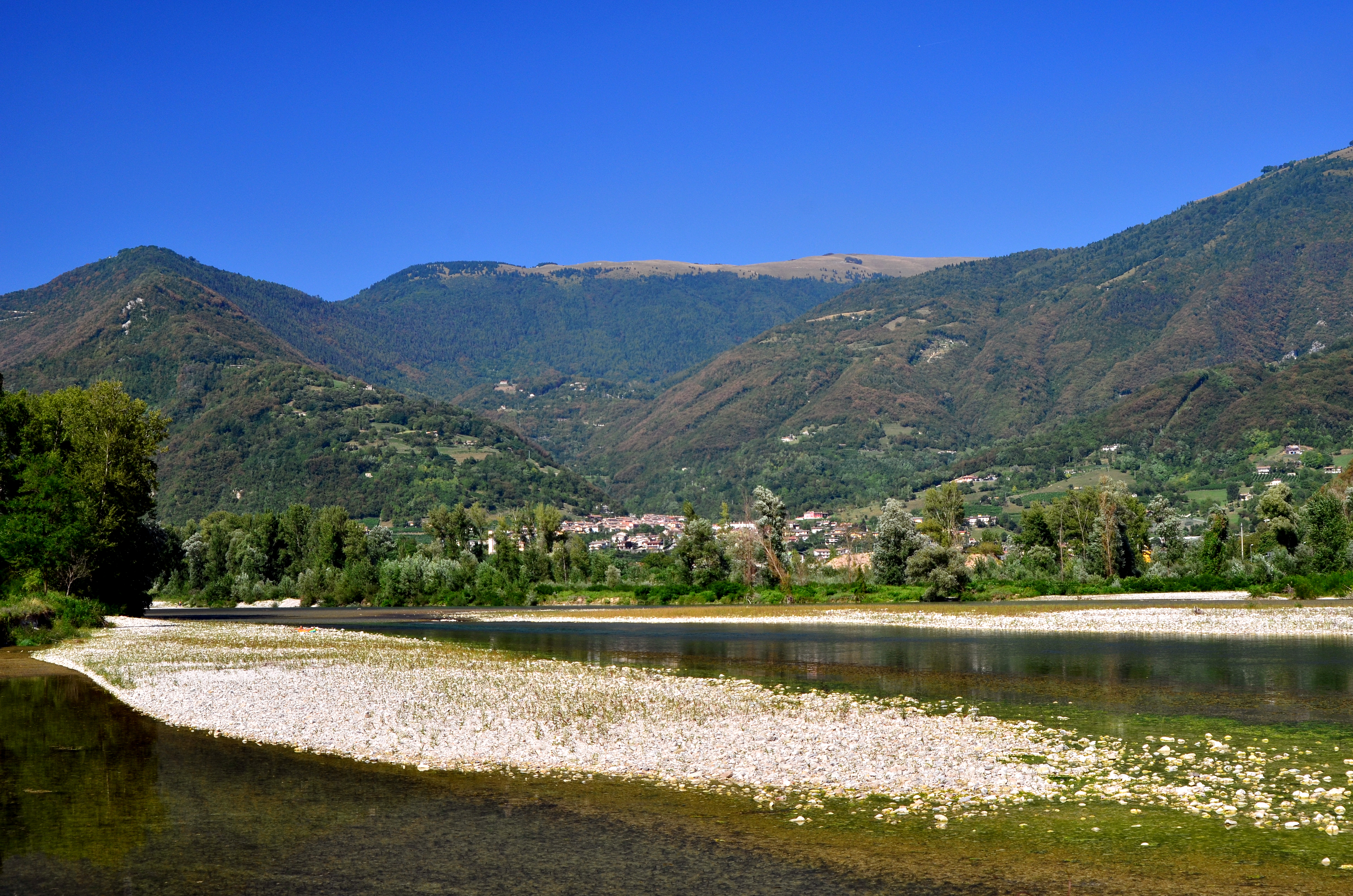
Piave river park

The province is mostly flat, but it has hilly terrain in the northern region. Along the border with the province of Belluno, there are mountainous areas with peaks reaching over a thousand meters. Mount Grappa and Col Visentin are the highest peaks. Montello, an isolated hill on the right bank of the Piave river, is also noteworthy.

The province is rich in water resources, with numerous springs (known as "fontanassi") in the mid-low area. The Sile River, originating in Casacorba, flows through Treviso's historic center. The main river is the Piave, characterized by a wide gravel bed along most of its course. Other notable watercourses include the Livenza, Monticano and Meschio, originating from the foothill area.

=== Municipalities ===
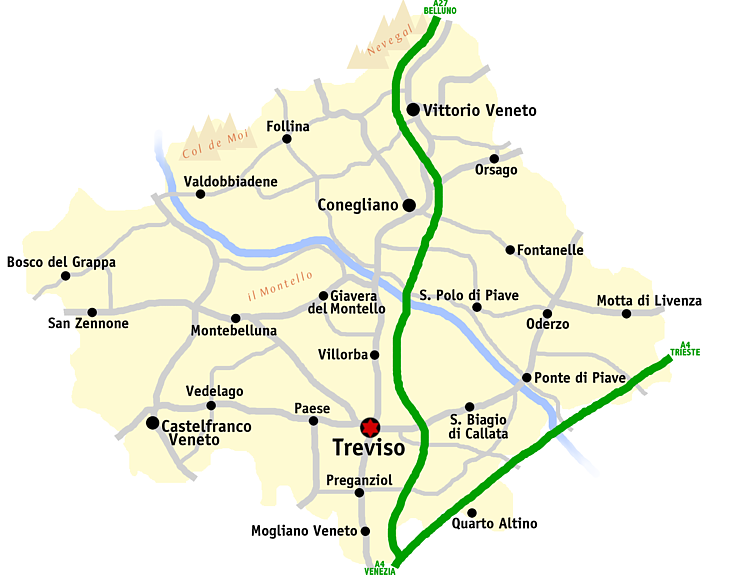
Cities, towns and roads in the province

Treviso, facade of the Cathedral

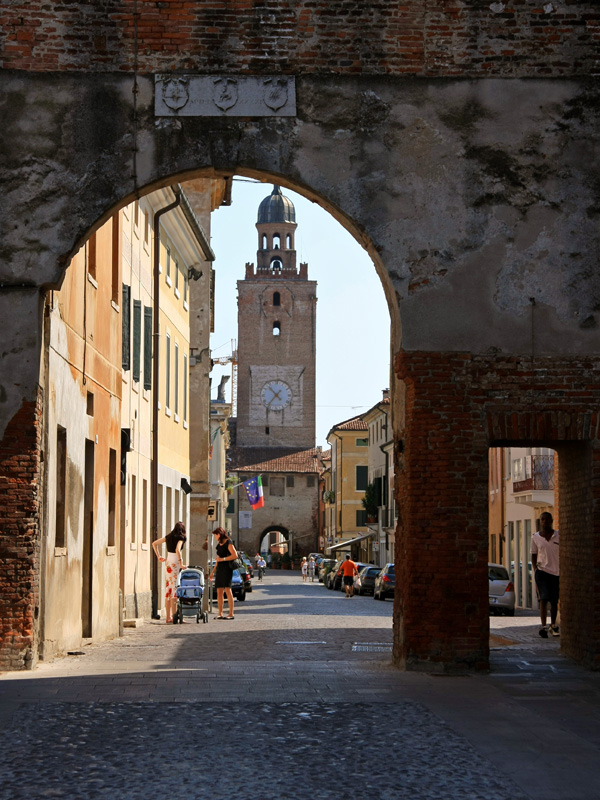
Castelfranco Veneto

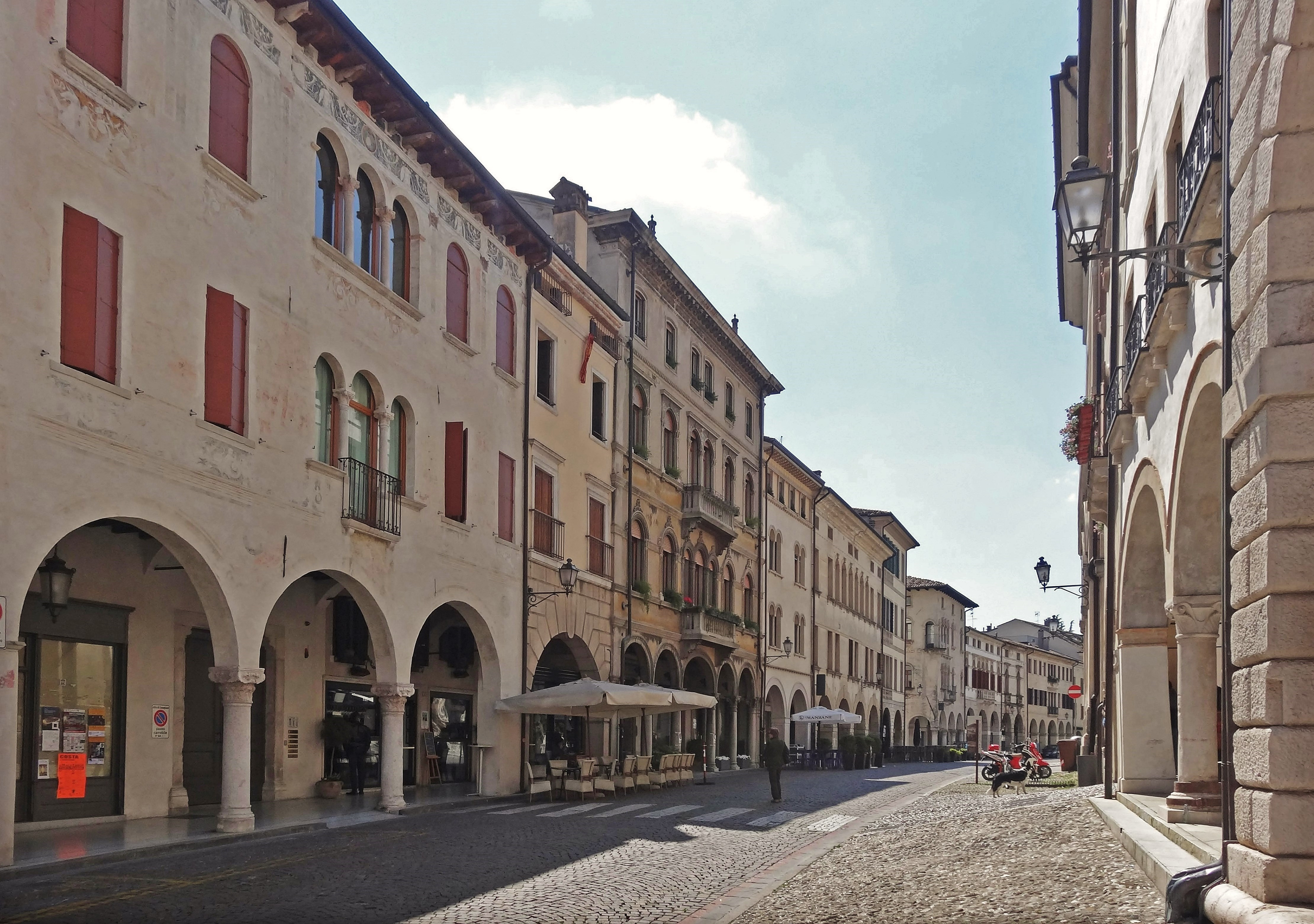
Conegliano, Via XX September

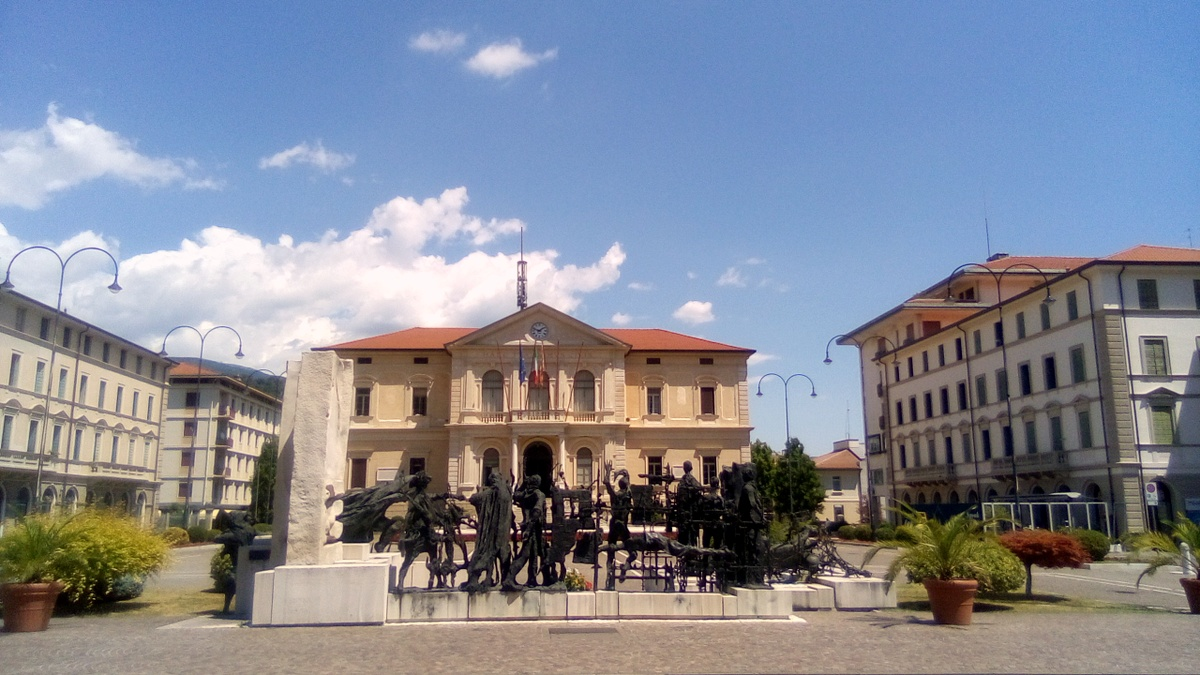
Vittorio Veneto city hall

The province has 94 municipalities:

- Altivole
- Arcade
- Asolo
- Borso del Grappa
- Breda di Piave
- Caerano di San Marco
- Cappella Maggiore
- Carbonera
- Casale sul Sile
- Casier
- Castelcucco
- Castelfranco Veneto
- Castello di Godego
- Cavaso del Tomba
- Cessalto
- Chiarano
- Cimadolmo
- Cison di Valmarino
- Codogné
- Colle Umberto
- Conegliano
- Cordignano
- Cornuda
- Crocetta del Montello
- Farra di Soligo
- Follina
- Fontanelle
- Fonte
- Fregona
- Gaiarine
- Giavera del Montello
- Godega di Sant'Urbano
- Gorgo al Monticano
- Istrana
- Loria
- Mansuè
- Mareno di Piave
- Maser
- Maserada sul Piave
- Meduna di Livenza
- Miane
- Mogliano Veneto
- Monastier di Treviso
- Monfumo
- Montebelluna
- Morgano
- Moriago della Battaglia
- Motta di Livenza
- Nervesa della Battaglia
- Oderzo
- Ormelle
- Orsago
- Paese
- Pederobba
- Pieve del Grappa
- Pieve di Soligo
- Ponte di Piave
- Ponzano Veneto
- Portobuffolé
- Possagno
- Povegliano
- Preganziol
- Quinto di Treviso
- Refrontolo
- Resana
- Revine Lago
- Riese Pio X
- Roncade
- Salgareda
- San Biagio di Callalta
- San Fior
- San Pietro di Feletto
- San Polo di Piave
- San Vendemiano
- San Zenone degli Ezzelini
- Santa Lucia di Piave
- Sarmede
- Segusino
- Sernaglia della Battaglia
- Silea
- Spresiano
- Susegana
- Tarzo
- Trevignano
- Treviso
- Valdobbiadene
- Vazzola
- Vedelago
- Vidor
- Villorba
- Vittorio Veneto
- Volpago del Montello
- Zenson di Piave
- Zero Branco

== Demographics ==
Historical population
Year	Pop.	±%
1861	-	—
1871	358,570	—
1881	381,072	+6.3%
1901	416,935	+9.4%
1911	508,150	+21.9%
1921	561,747	+10.5%
1931	581,660	+3.5%
1936	570,566	−1.9%
1951	612,800	+7.4%
1961	607,616	−0.8%
1971	668,620	+10.0%
1981	720,580	+7.8%
1991	744,038	+3.3%
2001	795,264	+6.9%
2011	876,790	+10.3%
2021	877,890	+0.1%
Source: ISTAT

As of 2026, the population is 878,341, of which 49.6% are male, and 50.4% are female. Minors make up 14.9% of the population, and seniors make up 24.8%.

=== Immigration ===
As of 2025, immigrants make up 15.2% of the population. The 5 largest foreign countries of birth are Romania, Albania, Morocco, China, and North Macedonia.

== Economy ==
The province is home to the headquarters of clothing retailer Benetton, Sisley, Stefanel, Geox, Diadora and Lotto Sport Italia, appliance maker De'Longhi and bicycle maker Pinarello.

== Transport ==
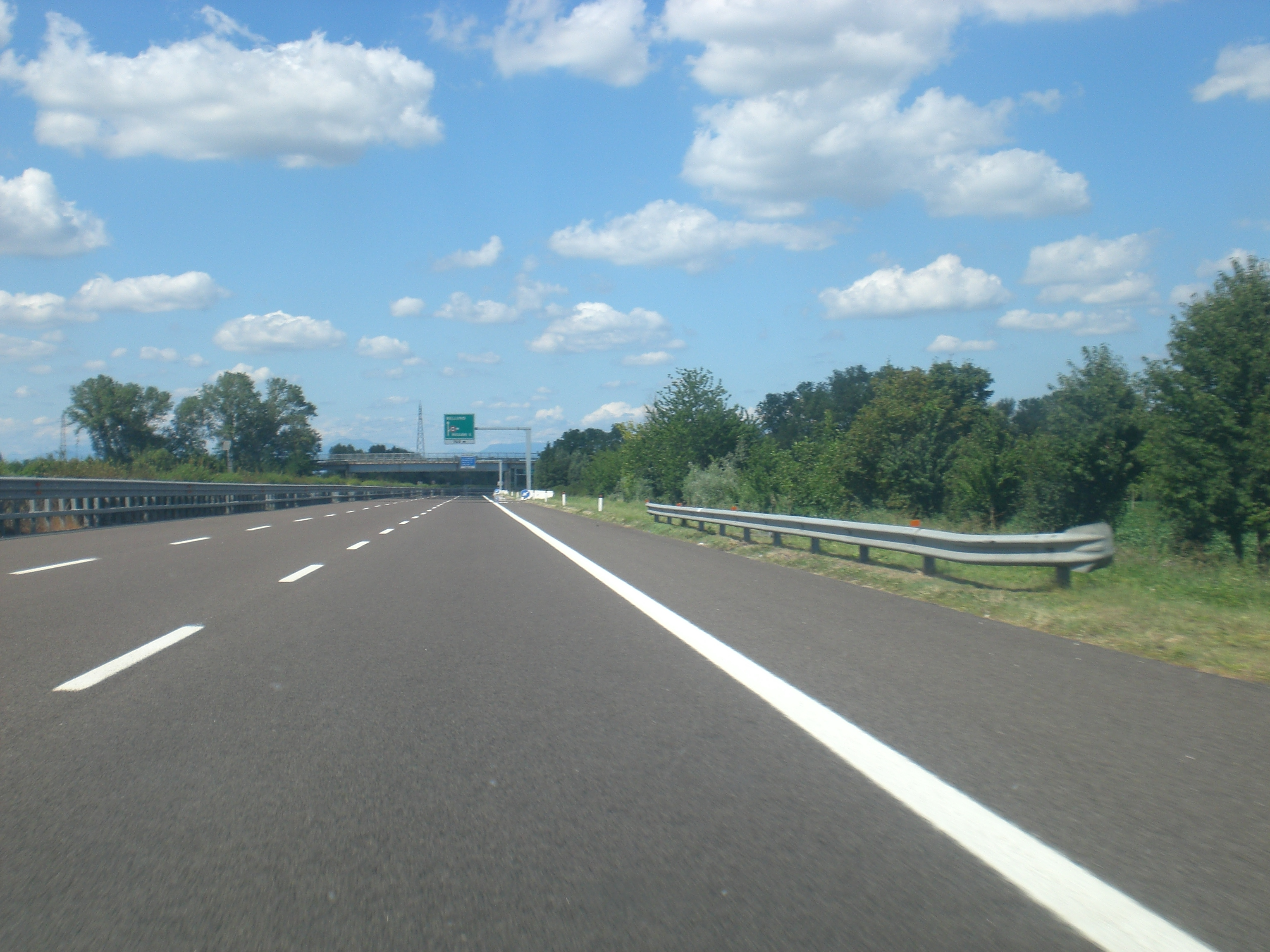
Autostrada A27 near Mogliano Veneto

=== Motorways ===
- Autostrada A4: Turin-Trieste
- Autostrada A27: Mestre-Belluno
- Autostrada A28: Conegliano-Portogruaro
- Superstrada Pedemontana Veneta

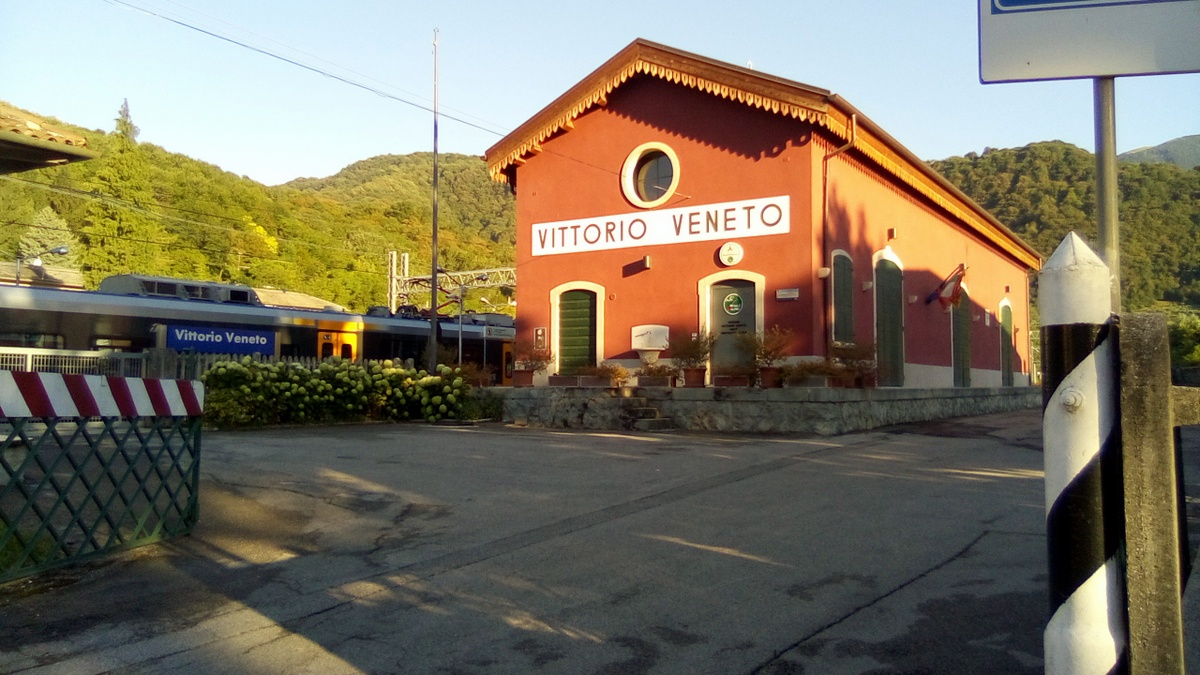
Vittorio Veneto station

=== Railway lines ===
- Calalzo–Padua railway
- Trento–Venice railway
- Venice–Conegliano-Belluno railway
- Venice–Trieste railway
- Venice–Udine-Gorizia railway

=== Airports ===
- Treviso Airport

=== Image gallery ===
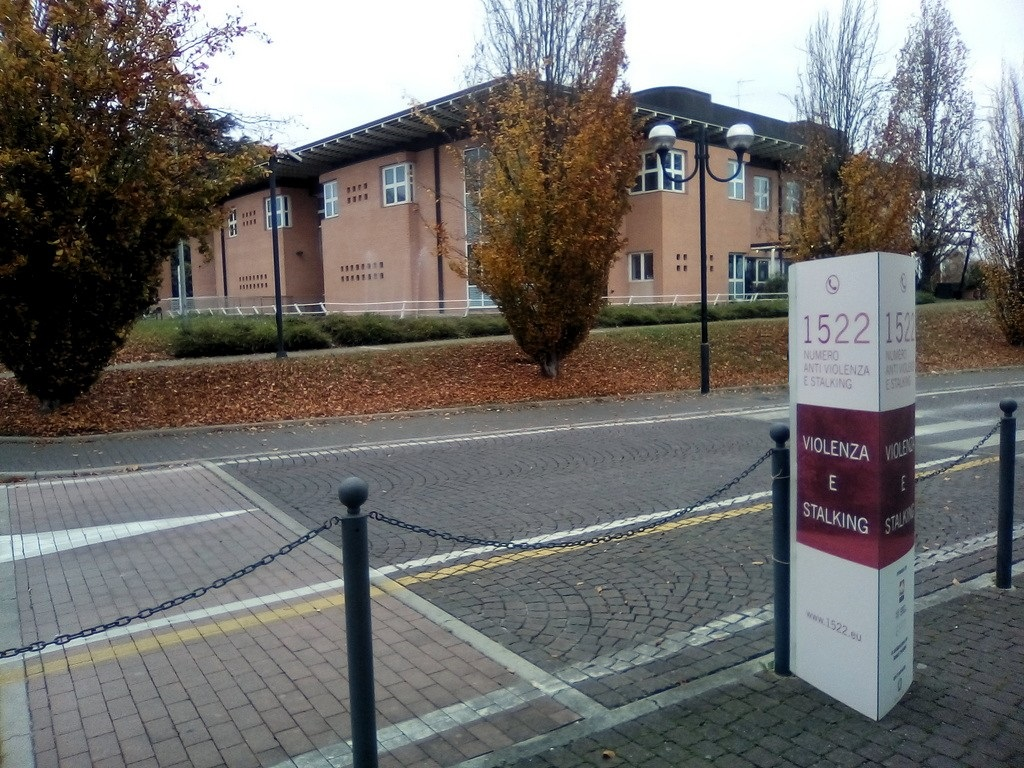
Montebelluna municipal library

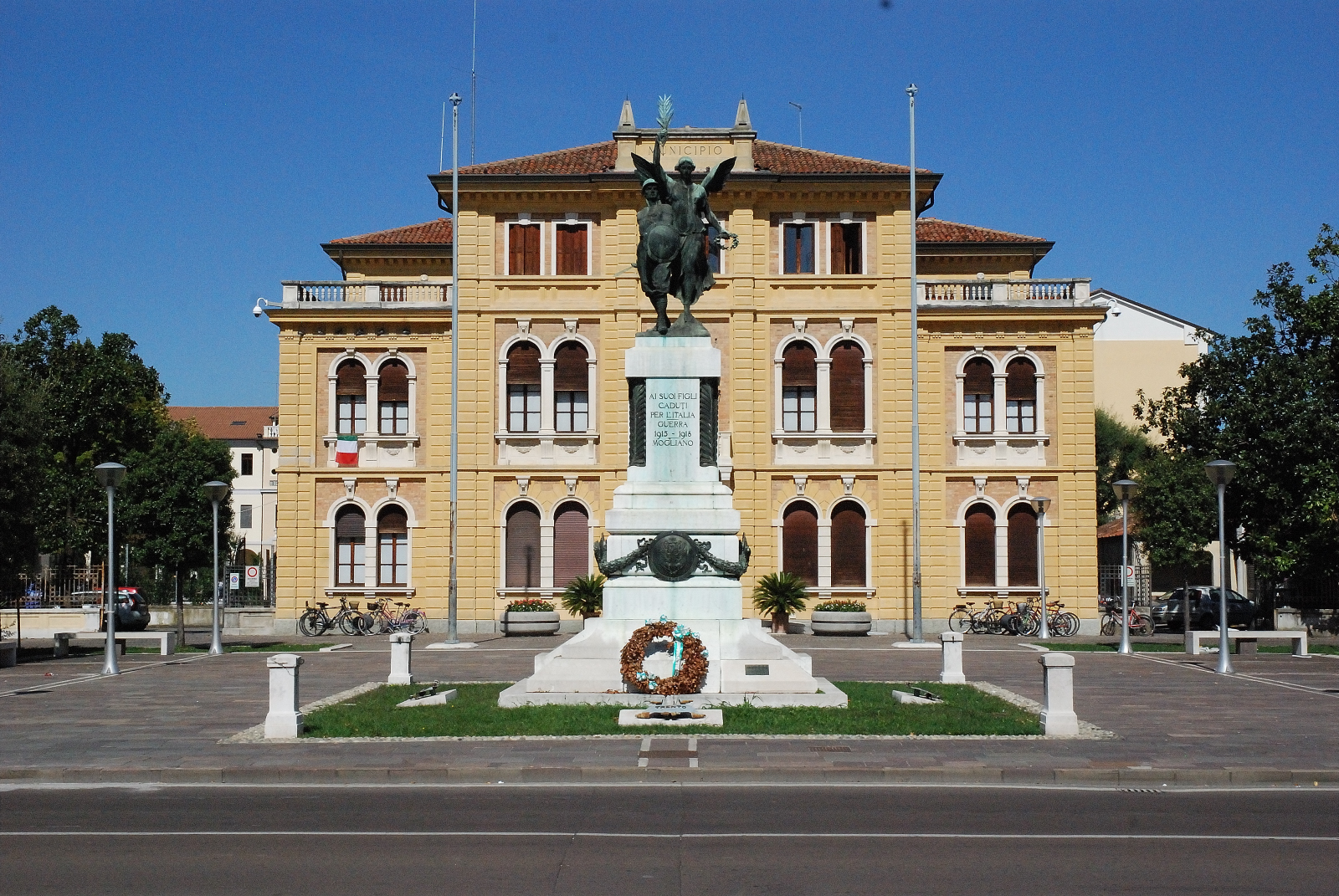
Mogliano Veneto

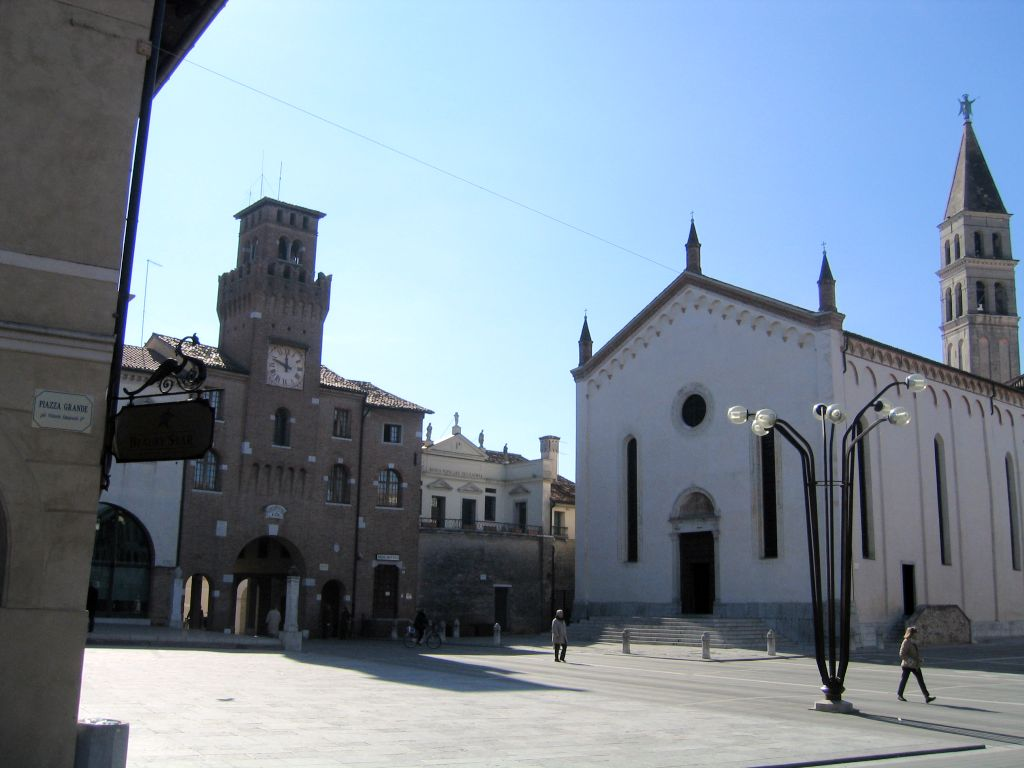
Oderzo

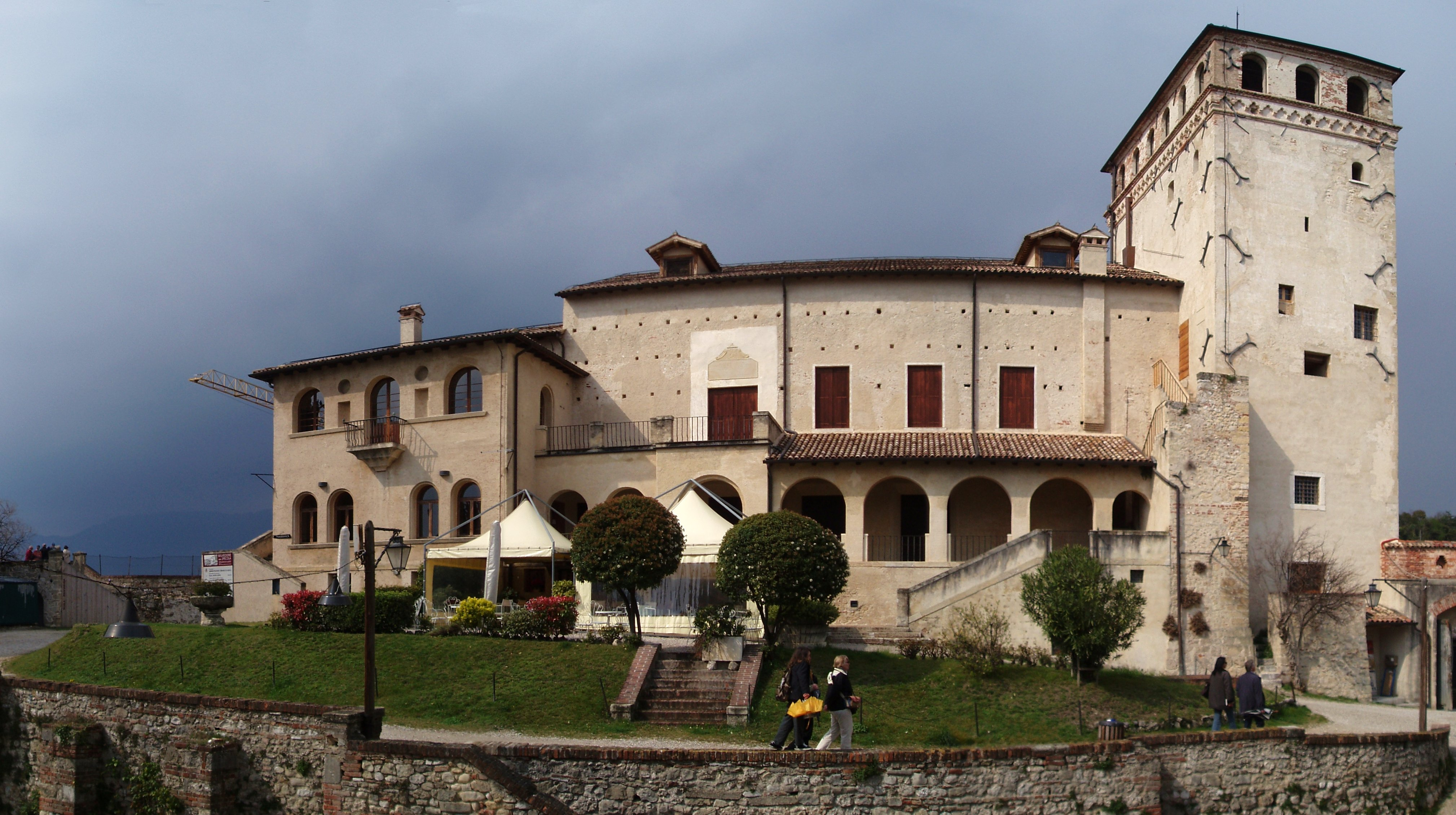
Asolo

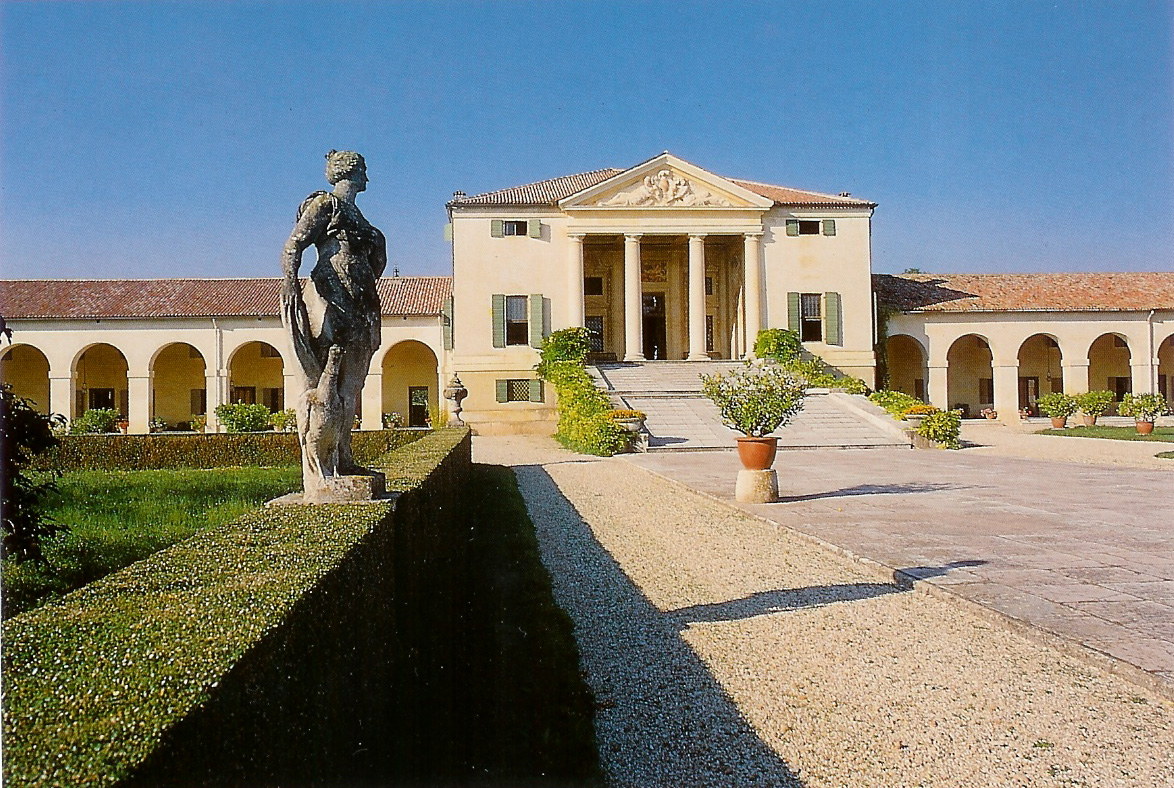
Vedelago

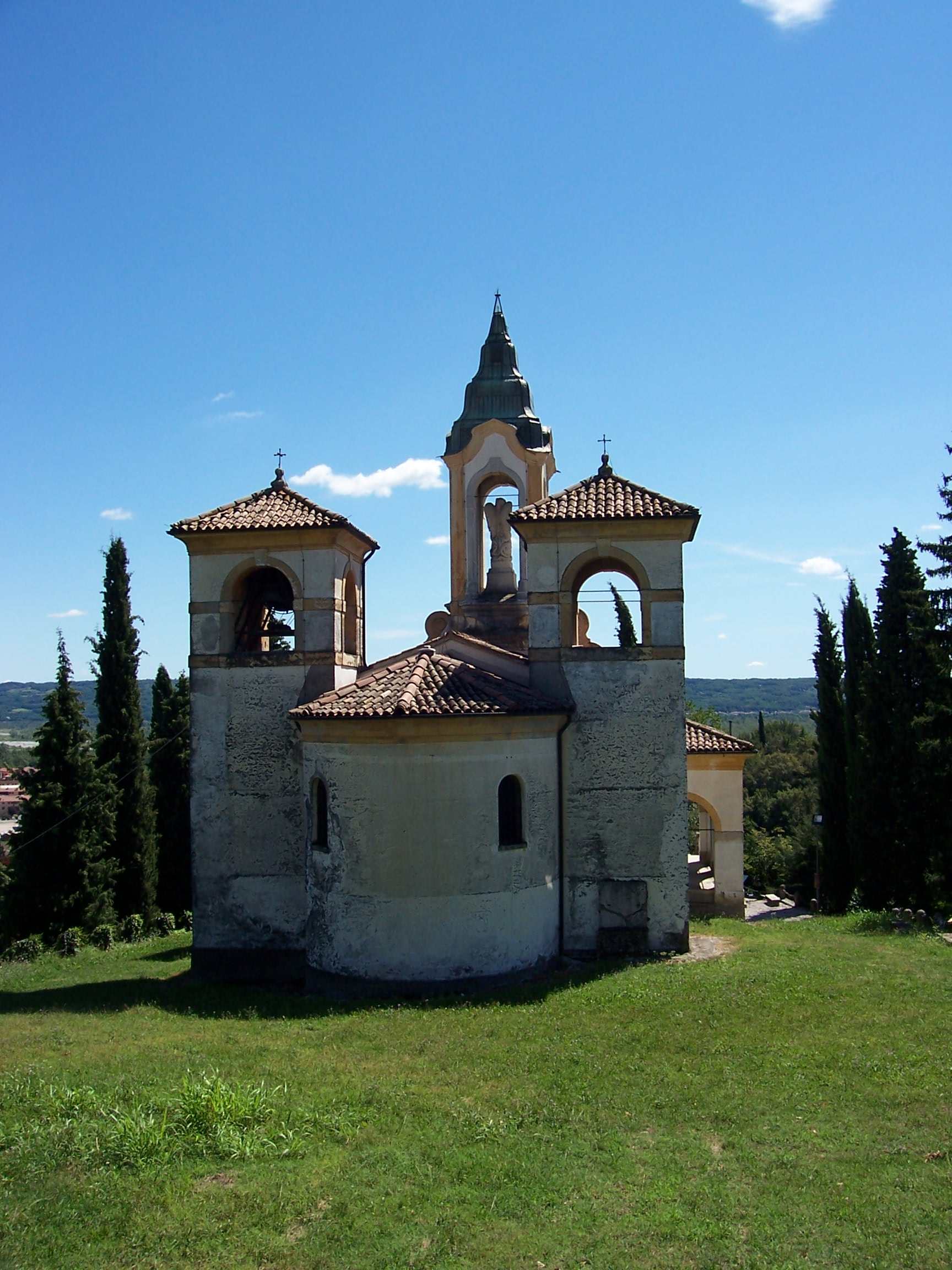
Vidor castle

== External sites ==
- Official website of the Province of Treviso (in Italian)
