= Breda di Piave =

- Comune
- Comune di Breda di Piave
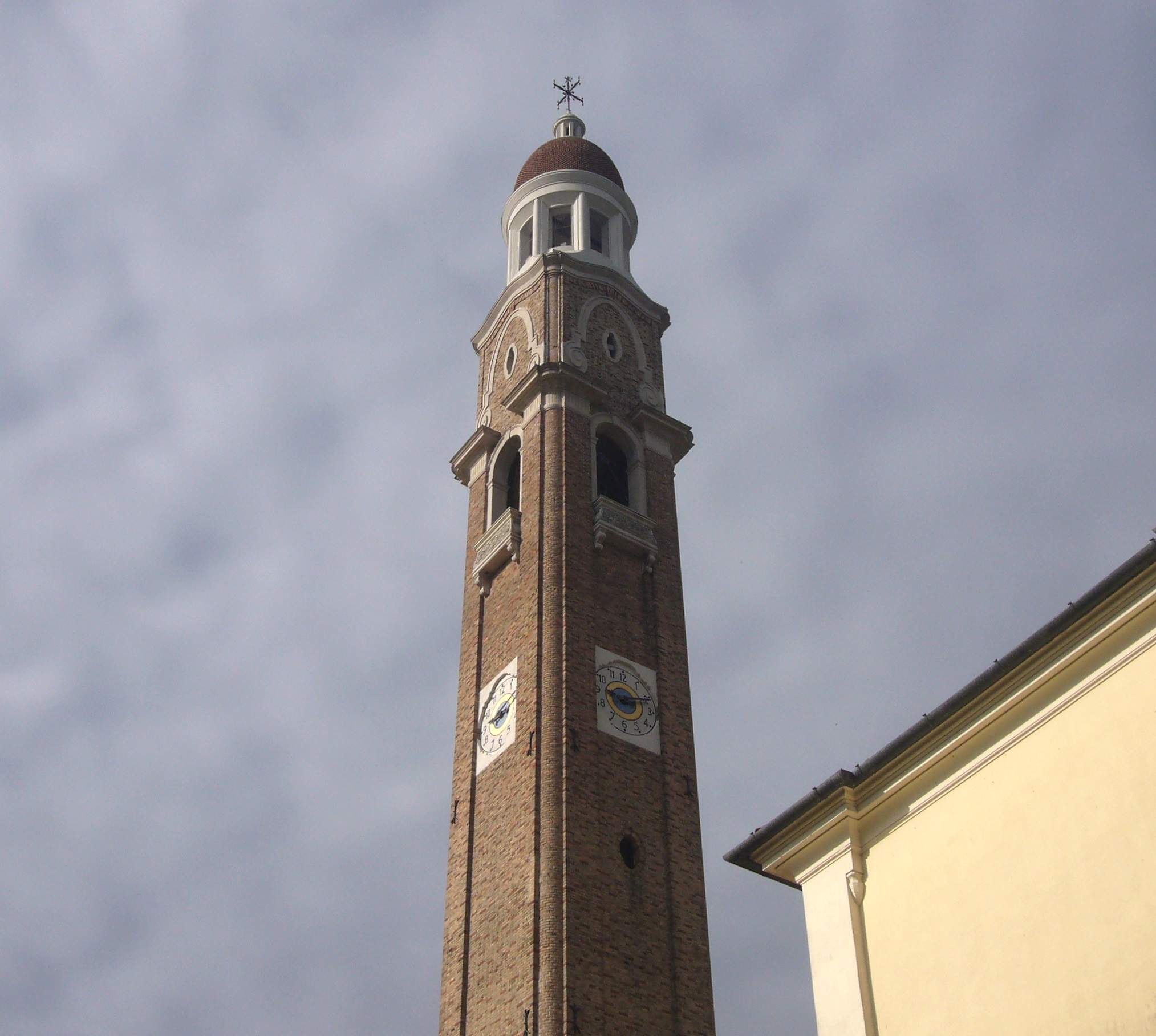

- Coat of arms

- Location within Italy Location within Veneto
- Coordinates: 45°43′N 12°20′E
- Country: Italy
- Region: Veneto
- Province: Treviso (TV)
- Frazioni: Pero, Saletto di Piave, San Bartolomeo, Vacil; Località: Campagne

Government
  - Mayor: Moreno Rossetto

Area
  - Total: 25.60 km^{2} (9.88 sq mi)
- Elevation: 23 m (75 ft)

Population (31 March 2017)
  - Total: 7,887
  - Density: 308.1/km^{2} (797.9/sq mi)
- Demonym: Bredesi
- Time zone: UTC+1 (CET)
  - Summer (DST): UTC+2 (CEST)
- Postal code: 31030
- Dialing code: 0422
- Patron saint: Conversion of St. Paul
- Saint day: 25 January
- Website: Official website

Breda di Piave is a commune in the province of Treviso, Veneto, northern Italy.

Some believe the name is derived from the Latin praedia or the Lombard braida: both terms mean "estate, landed property."

== See also ==
- Piave River
