= San Vendemiano =

- Comune
- Comune di San Vendemiano
- Coat of arms

- Location within Italy Location within Veneto
- Coordinates: 45°53′29″N 12°20′20″E
- Country: Italy
- Region: Veneto
- Province: Treviso (TV)
- Frazioni: Zoppé

Government
  - Mayor: Guido Dussin

Area
  - Total: 18 km^{2} (6.9 sq mi)
- Elevation: 46 m (151 ft)

Population (31 December 2015)
  - Total: 10,054
  - Density: 560/km^{2} (1,400/sq mi)
- Demonym: Sanvendemianesi
- Time zone: UTC+1 (CET)
  - Summer (DST): UTC+2 (CEST)
- Postal code: 31020
- Dialing code: 0438
- Patron saint: San Vendemiale
- Saint day: 1 June
- Website: Official website

San Vendemiano is a municipality in the province of Treviso, northern Italy, 30 kilometres (19 mi) from Treviso.

Footballer Alessandro del Piero grew up in San Vendemiano.

== Twin towns ==
- Nova Gorica, Slovenia, since 1973

== Notable people ==
- Regina Dal Cin (1819 – 1897), Osteopath and bone-setter
