= Cordignano =

Cordignano San Cassiano del Meschio
- Comune
- Comune di Cordignano
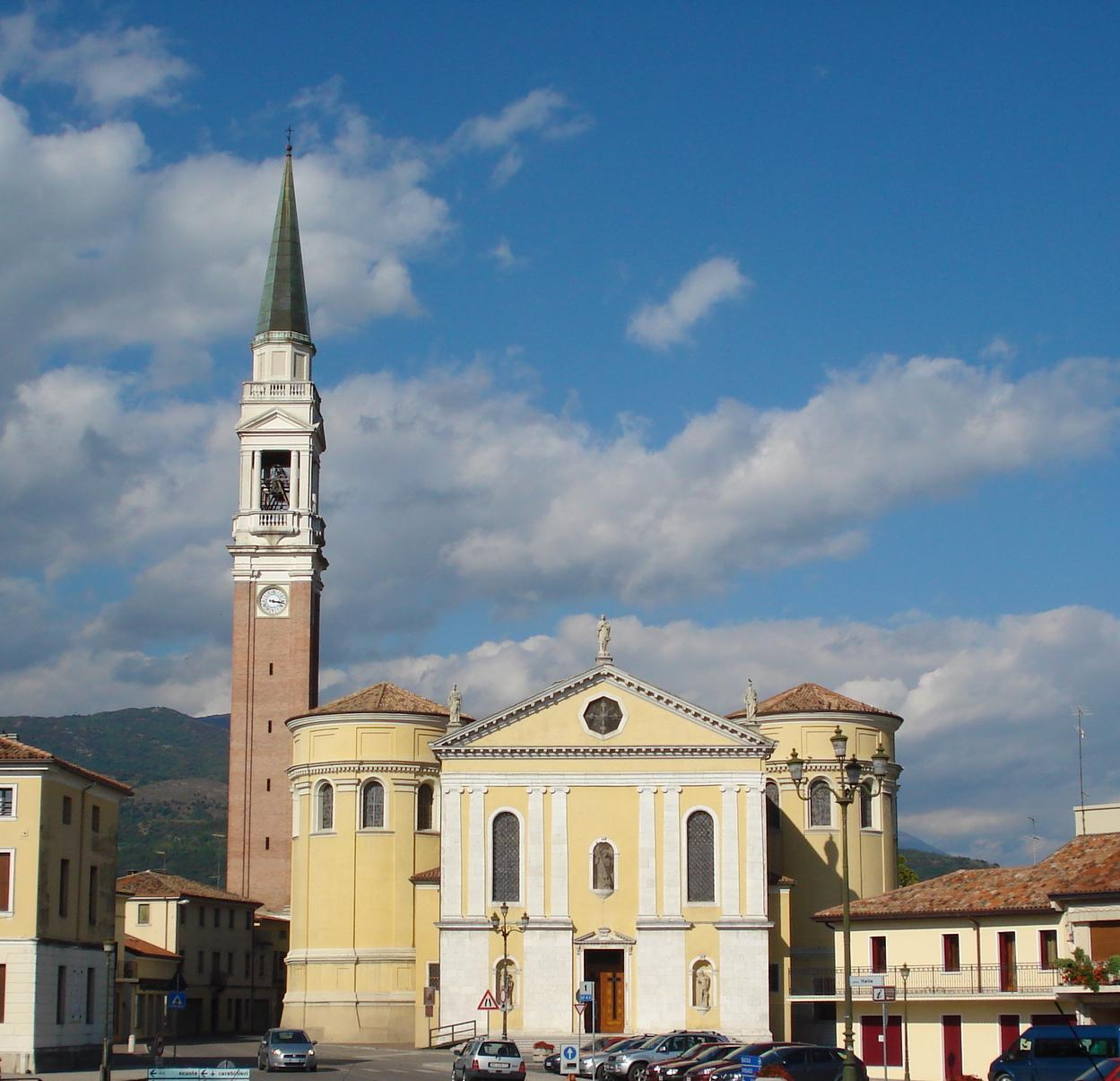
- Church of Santi Maria Assunta e Cassiano

- Coat of arms

- Location within Italy Location within Veneto
- Coordinates: 45°57′N 12°25′E
- Country: Italy
- Region: Veneto
- Province: Treviso (TV)
- Frazioni: Pinidello, Ponte della Muda, Villa di Villa

Government
  - Mayor: Roberto Campagna (lista civica (Cordignano Viva))

Area
  - Total: 26 km^{2} (10 sq mi)
- Elevation: 56 m (184 ft)

Population (June 30, 2025)
  - Total: 6,812
  - Density: 260/km^{2} (680/sq mi)
- Demonym: Cordignanesi
- Time zone: UTC+1 (CET)
  - Summer (DST): UTC+2 (CEST)
- Postal code: 31016
- Dialing code: (+39) 0438
- Patron saint: Sts. Peter and Paul
- Saint day: June 29
- Website: Official website

Cordignano is a comune (municipality), with 6,812 inhabitants in the province of Treviso, in the Italian region of Veneto and borders the following municipalities: Caneva (PN), Cappella Maggiore, Colle Umberto, Fregona, Godega di Sant'Urbano, Orsago, Sacile (PN).

== Origin of the name ==
Cordignano, attested in 1138 as Curdiniano and in 1298 as Crudiniano, is thought to be a predial derived from the Latin personal Cordo or Cordus. Originally, it referred only to the castle of Cordignano (today's Castelat di Villa di Villa), while the town was long called San Cassiano del Meschio, an expression that is still preserved in the dialect and to indicate the parish church.

== Morphology of the territory ==
Located on the border between Veneto and Friuli-Venezia Giulia (province of Pordenone), the municipality of Cordignano covers a considerable portion of the territory, elevation varying between 25 and 1,079 metres (82 and 3,540 ft) above sea level, extending from the plateau to the plains below Cansiglio, to the north of road SS 13.

Element that strongly characterizes the region is the presence of Meschio River, which runs through the town, coming from Vittorio Veneto.

== History ==
The first inhabited center of the territory of the municipality dates back to prehistoric times. It then traces of a fort (known as Castelat) dated between the 14th and 10th centuries BC, in the north, at the Alpine foothills of Belluno.

In Roman times the area continued to grow mainly in the agricultural field, forming an active farming community still witnessed in the Middle Ages. It was in this period that the center took on the name Corticionus (hence Cordignano).

In the 13th century it became the curia of da Camino, then between the 15th and 18th century it was a fief of the Rangoni family of Modena, passing in the 18th century to the branch of the Mocenigo family in Venice with residence at San Stae.

The city appears as Curdigniano, on maps in Vaticano Gallery of Maps, painted in years 1580-1585 by Antonio Danti (Vaticano Gallery of Maps).

In the 20th century Cordignano should be remembered for the development of the craft industry, and then the industry, still thriving today, in part by changing the orientation of agricultural previous centuries and behaving even a redesign of the territory, with vast industrial zones and new infrastructure.

== Monuments and places of interest ==
=== Religious buildings ===
The different centers that draw the municipal area, mostly of rural origin, find their center in the ancient religious buildings are listed below those of historical and architectural importance:

- The church of Saint Maria Assunta and Cassiano del Meschio is the church of Cordignano center, the hub of the city. It was built in the 17th century, stands on the foundations of ancient buildings dating back to the pre-existing Roman and medieval times; the current building has a gabled façade divided into three by pairs of Ionic pilasters, terminating in a pediment surmounted by jagged and three sculptures. Internally it contains artistic works by Palma il Giovane, Giovanni De Min, Marco Domenico Tintoretto and Marco Vecellio. It is also characterized by the presence, on the left side of a tall bell tower of the 20th century.
- St. Stephen's Church is the parish church of the frazione Pinidello important for the cycle of frescoes of the interior, attributed to Francesco Del Zotto.
- Church of San Zeno is the ancient church (13th century), of the frazione Silvella.
- Church of San Valentino church of Ponte della Muda, with a small bell tower and a large stone statue of the patron saint inserted in front, above the stone portal.

==== Parish recreation centres ====
- Oratory of Via Isonzo: octagonal building with a gabled portal, is inserted between the buildings of downtown and in a good condition.
- Oratory of Via Piave: small religious building with gabled façade with a portal surmounted by a tympanum heavily remodeled; is located adjacent to an old village and is in a poor state of preservation.

=== Civic buildings ===
Among the civil architecture of some significance, the agricultural past has left the old villages (including those held arcades in the center of the capital, in the 17th century), rural houses and some mansions, homes of families who have had influence on the territory and architectural expressions of their prestige.

==== Venetian villas ====
Below is a list of the main Venetian villas in the municipality:

- Villa Rota Brandolini d'Adda Casanova Zanussi (18th century)
- Villa Mocenigo detta "Belvedere" hamlet Villa di Villa (17th century)
- Villa Pizzamiglio (Silvella, 18th century)

==== Palace of the duty ====
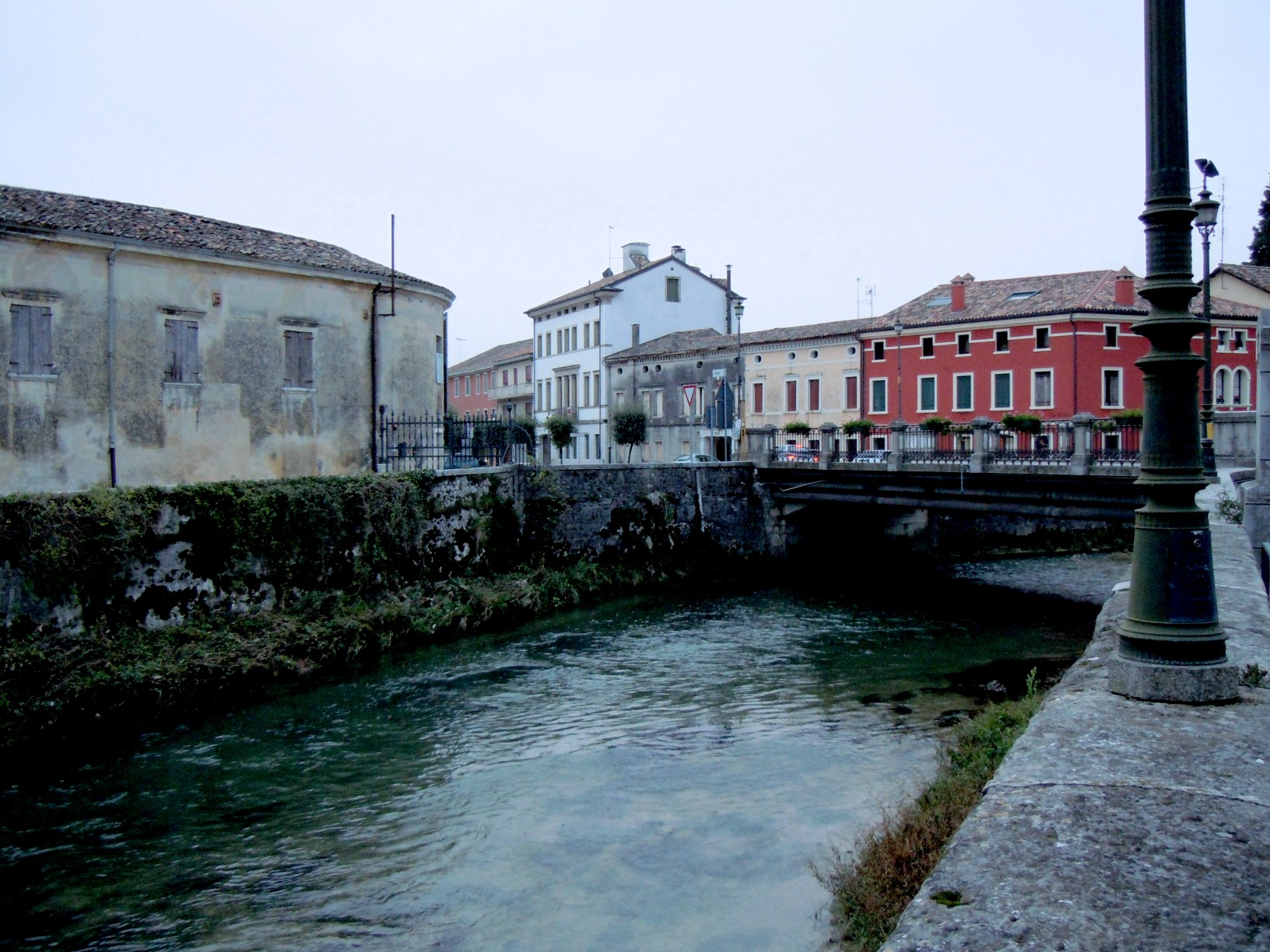
The River Meschio in Piazza Italia

Building of the 16th century in Ponte della Muda, the Palace was the seat of customs duty post in the only crossing place of the Meschio on the Venice-Udine, in fact the bridge of muda that gave name to the place. The property has a large covered porch with vaulted ceilings on the ground floor, with round arches supported by columns decorated with sculptural elements, the first floor is open by single lancet rectangular and surmounted by a mezzanine in the attic.

=== Natural areas ===
Cordignano is located south of the river Meschio, passing through the center of the square at the height of Piazza Italia, wetting the northern part of the park of Villa Rota Brandolini d'Adda. The many loops and the banks of the river, surrounded by numerous areas where the rural landscape keeps a certain integrity, strongly characterizing the territory of Cordignano.

== Events ==
- Premio Nazionale di Pittura, Grafica e Acquerello – Piero Della Valentina: annually, in the fall, is held a national painting prize established in 1989 which attracts artists from all over Italy and from abroad.
- Festa delle prealpi ("Feast of the Alpine foothills"): in autumn; sculptors create their works for visitors, there are typical handicraft market, food stalls and the prize of the woodcutter.

== Demographic evolution ==
Historical population

Year	Pop.	±%
1861	?	—
1871	4,492	—
1881	4,335	−3.5%
1901	4,538	+4.7%
1911	5,401	+19.0%
1921	6,090	+12.8%

Year	Pop.	±%
1931	5,888	−3.3%
1936	5,922	+0.6%
1951	6,007	+1.4%
1961	5,586	−7.0%
1971	5,666	+1.4%
1981	5,888	+3.9%

Year	Pop.	±%
1991	5,803	−1.4%
2001	6,374	+9.8%
2011	7,096	+11.3%
2021	6,900	−2.8%

Source: Data from ISTAT

=== Ethnicities and foreign minorities ===
As of December 31, 2024 there were 580 foreign residents in the municipality, or 8.4% of the population. The largest groups are listed below:

- Romania: 163
- Albania: 93
- Morocco: 51
- Ukraine: 34
- North Macedonia: 32

== People ==
- Ennio Salvador (born 1960), cyclist
