= Cimadolmo =

- Comune
- Comune di Cimadolmo
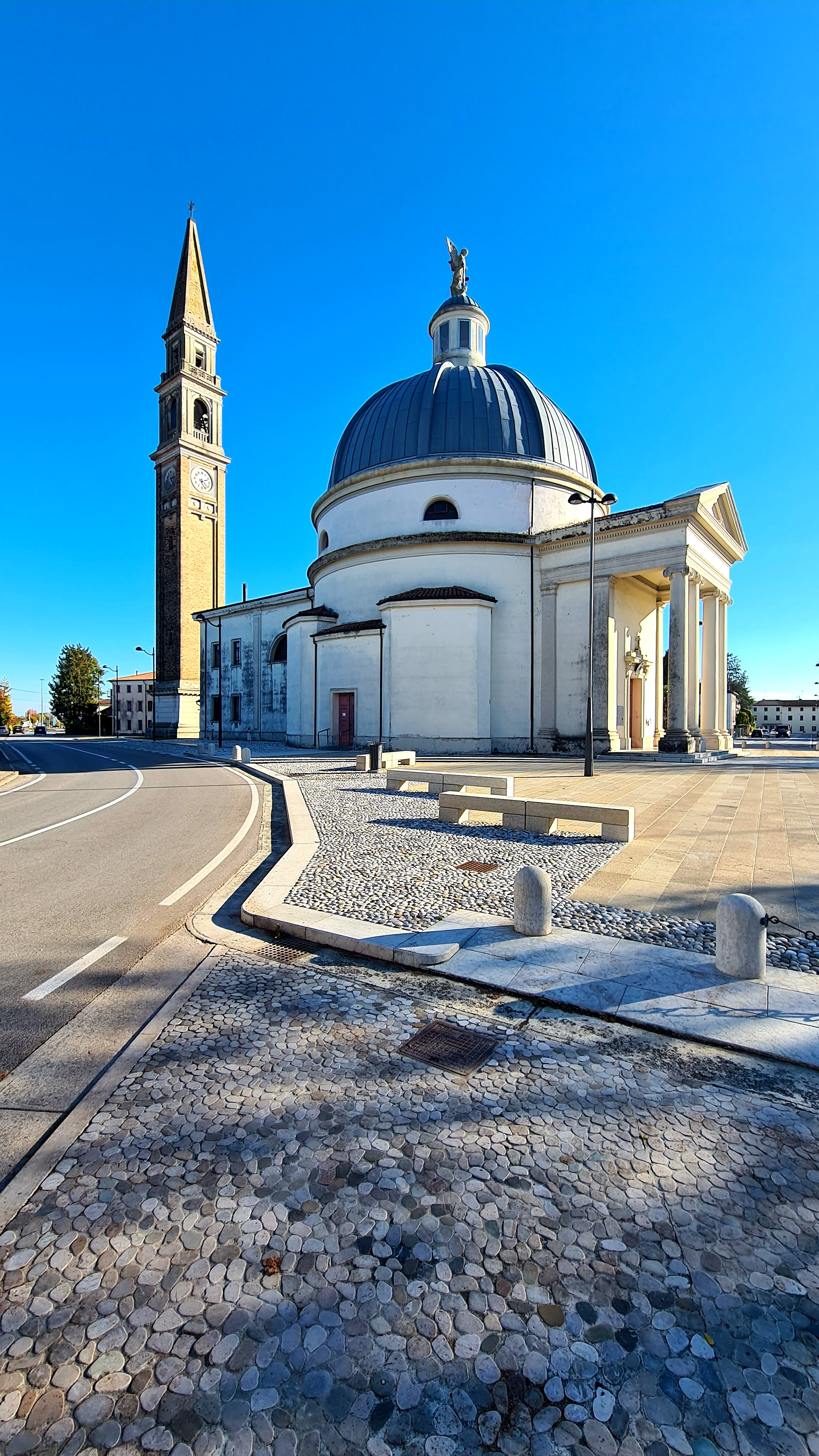

- Coat of arms

- Location within Italy Location within Veneto
- Coordinates: 45°47′N 12°22′E
- Country: Italy
- Region: Veneto
- Province: Treviso (TV)
- Frazioni: San Michele di Piave, Stabiuzzo

Government
  - Mayor: Giovanni Ministeri

Area
  - Total: 17.9 km^{2} (6.9 sq mi)
- Elevation: 32 m (105 ft)

Population (31 March 2017)
  - Total: 3,375
  - Density: 189/km^{2} (488/sq mi)
- Demonym: Cimadolmesi
- Time zone: UTC+1 (CET)
  - Summer (DST): UTC+2 (CEST)
- Postal code: 31010
- Dialing code: 0422
- Patron saint: St. Sylvester
- Saint day: 31 December
- Website: Official website

Cimadolmo is a comune in the province of Treviso, Veneto, northern Italy.
