= Annina Morosini =

Italian socialite and salonist

Anna Morosini
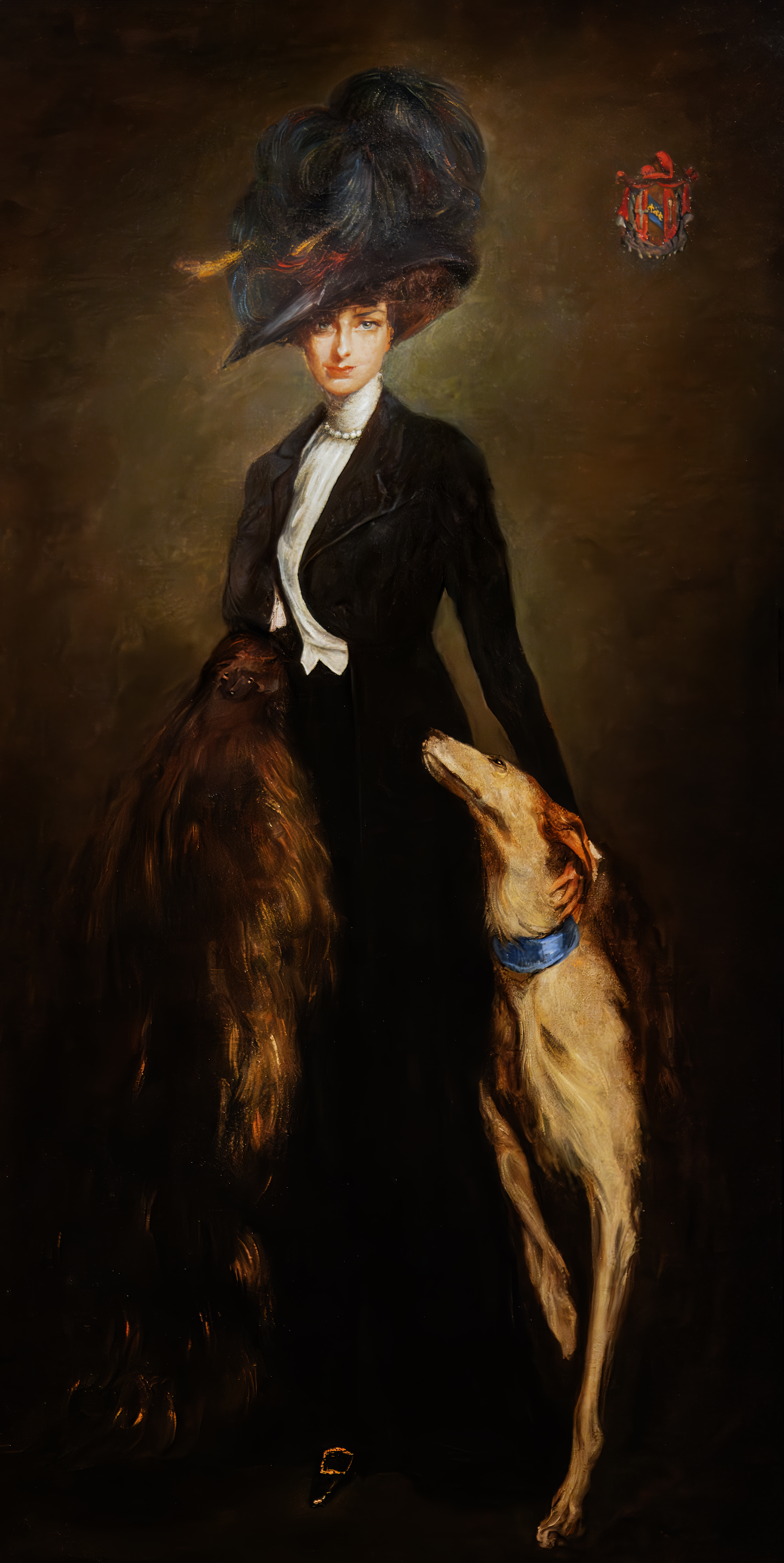
- Portrait by Lino Selvatico, 1908
- Born: Anna Sara Nicoletta Maria Rombo; 30 July 1864; Palermo, Kingdom of Italy
- Died: 10 April 1954 (aged 89); Venice, Italy
- Occupations: Noblewoman, socialite and salonist

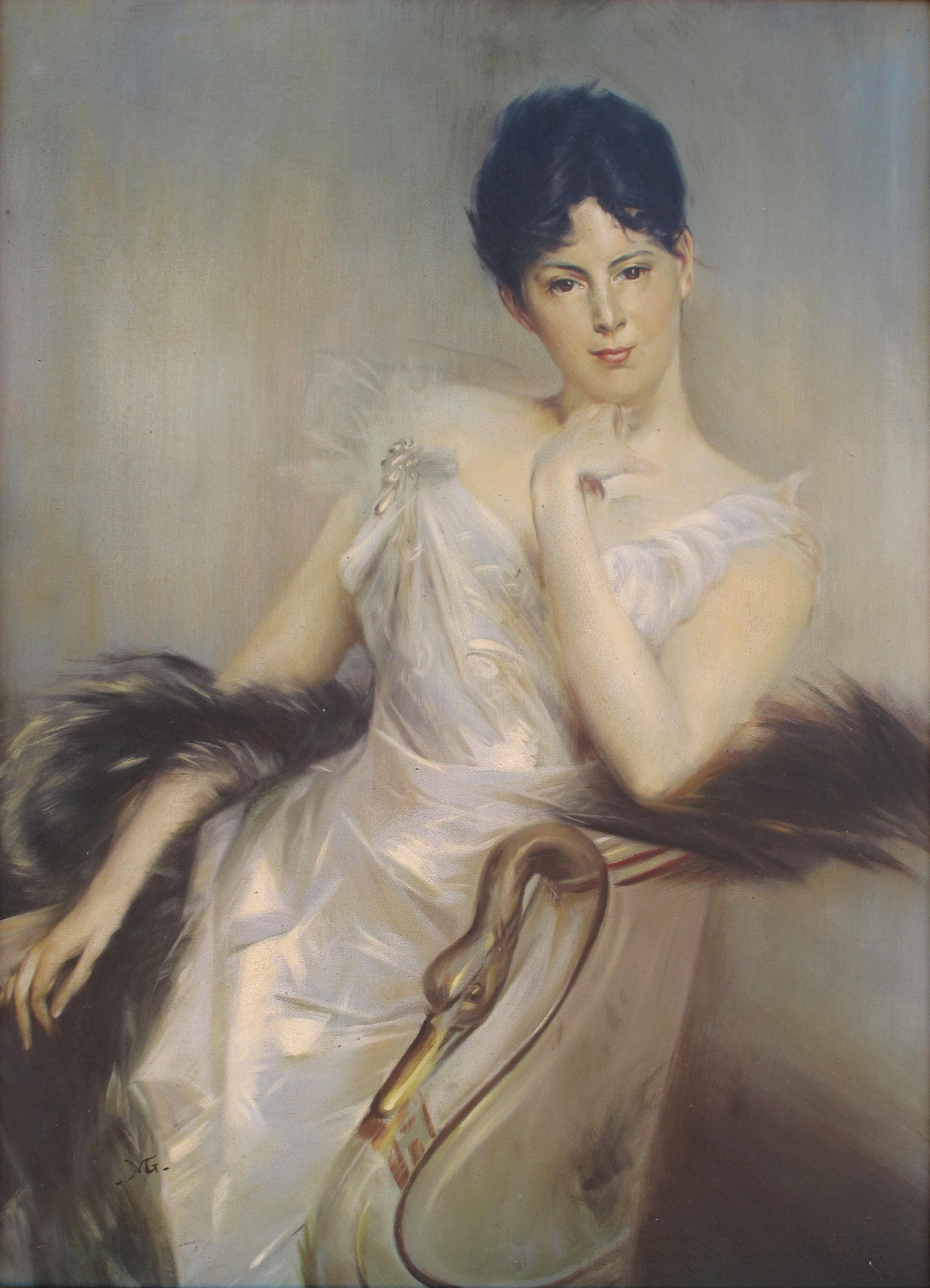
Portrait of Anna Morosini by Michele Gordigiani

Annina Morosini, born Anna Sara Nicoletta Maria Rombo (1864–1954), was an Italian noblewoman who was famous for her salons, her patronage of the arts and her lovers.

== Life ==
Anna Sara Nicoletta Maria Rombo born in Palermo 30 July 1864, was one of three daughters of Agostino Rombo, the director of the Bank of Italy, and his wife Caroline Thorel, who came from a family of French wealthy bankers. Annina's two elder sisters, Sonia and Sofia both died very young from diphtheria. The loss plunged her mother into depression and making her focus all her time and energy on her only remaining daughter Annina.

The family relocated from Palermo to Venice in the 1880s, where Annina's beauty, combined with the wealth of the family, made her a very eligible bride. In May 1885 she married Michele (Gino) Morosini of the venetian Morosini family The wedding was a lavish affair attended by many members of the Venetian nobility. The pink wedding gown worn by the bride was made by the Worth fashion house.

Her husband's family was seen as one of the ancient noble families of Venice, but they were poor in wealth. Nevertheless, through Annina's dowry and her husband's illustrious family it was seen as a splendid match. The newlyweds made their home at the luxurious palazzo Ca' d'Oro and in 1886 the couple had a daughter named Morosina.

But while Morosini threw herself into Venetian society, her husband was not interested in that life and was a reserved and shy person. The couple drifted apart, and the separation became final when her husband moved to Paris to pursue his own interests.

Morosini became a lady in waiting to Elena, Queen of Italy.

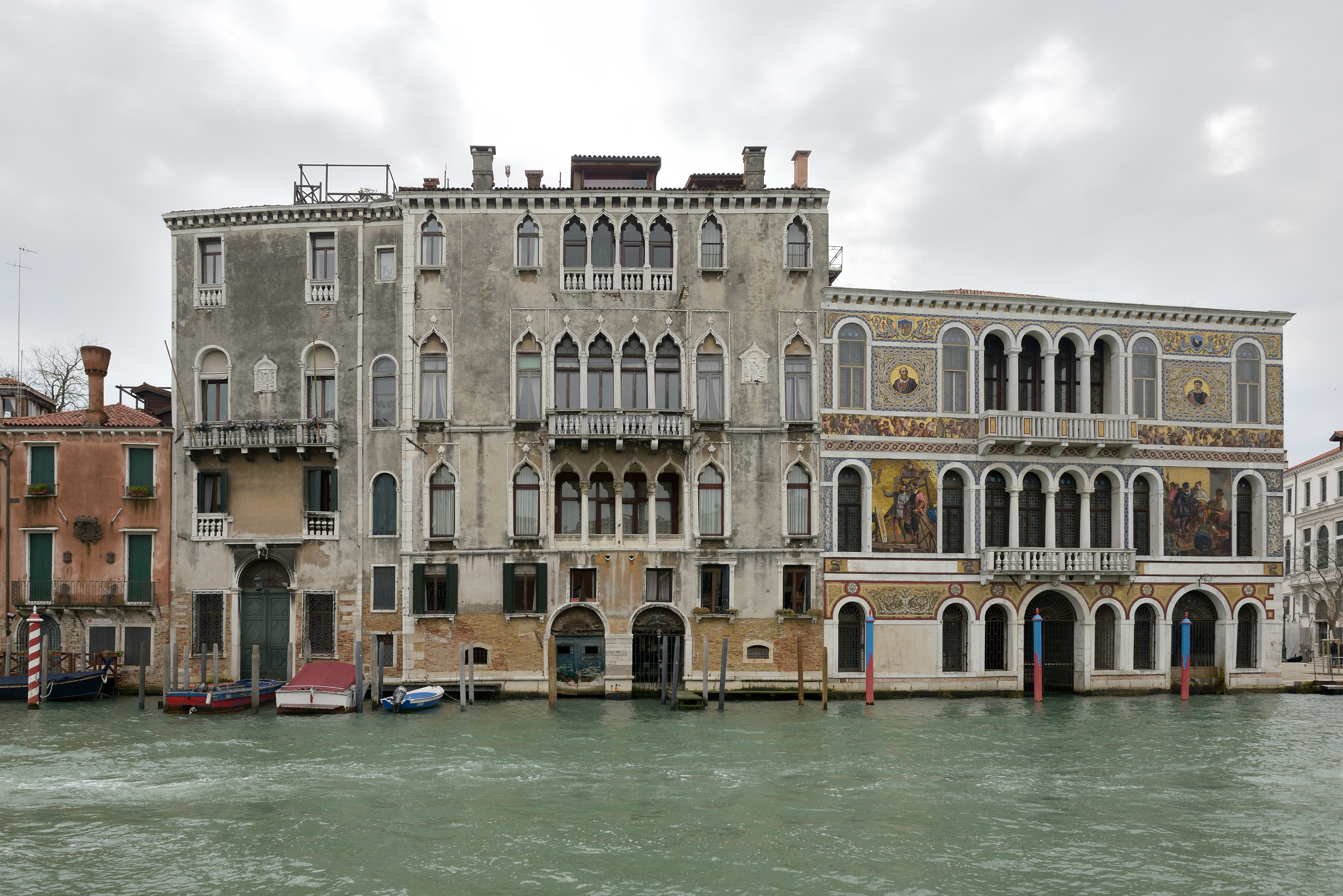

Morosini then lived at the Palazzo da Mula on the Grand Canal and was called the "uncrowned Queen of Venice," "La Divina" and "The Last Dogaress", because her husband's family had produced four doges and because of her being a leader of Venetian society. The countess knew many luminaries of her day like Rilke, Proust, Stravinsky, and Joyce.

Morosinis mother died in 1894 and she inherited the Villa Carlotta in Silea in 1913 from her father.

Her only daughter Morosina would go on to marry Luigi Nicolis dei Conti di Robilant e Cereaglio, the son of statesman Charles di Robilant.

Several artists like Lino Selvatico, Ralph Curtis and Cherubino Kirchmayr and Vittorio Matteo Corcos painted her. She was also a friend of the writer Gabriele D'Annunzio who used to say "that the countess ' dresses concealed a fishtail."

She was also intimate friend of the emperor Wilhelm II as well as Amedeo of Savoy, Duke of Aosta, the brother of Umberto I. Lady Layard was acquainted with her but complained that she kept her rooms dark and almost smothered with scent.

There is an anecdote, which tells of her meeting with her rival socialite Luisa Casati who said to the countess: "When I was a child my father already told me about your famous beauty." To which Annina replied: "Without going so far back, my dear, your husband, every evening, spoke to me about yours"; the implication being that they were on intimate terms.

Morosini also attended the air show at Brescia and is mentioned briefly by Kafka in his short story The Aeroplanes at Brescia.

In the 1930s the countess was seen as the leader of the social faction that represented the old noble families of Venice.

== Death ==
She continued on as a grand dame of society but rarely left her palazzo until her death in 1954 of a stroke.
