= Sile (river) =

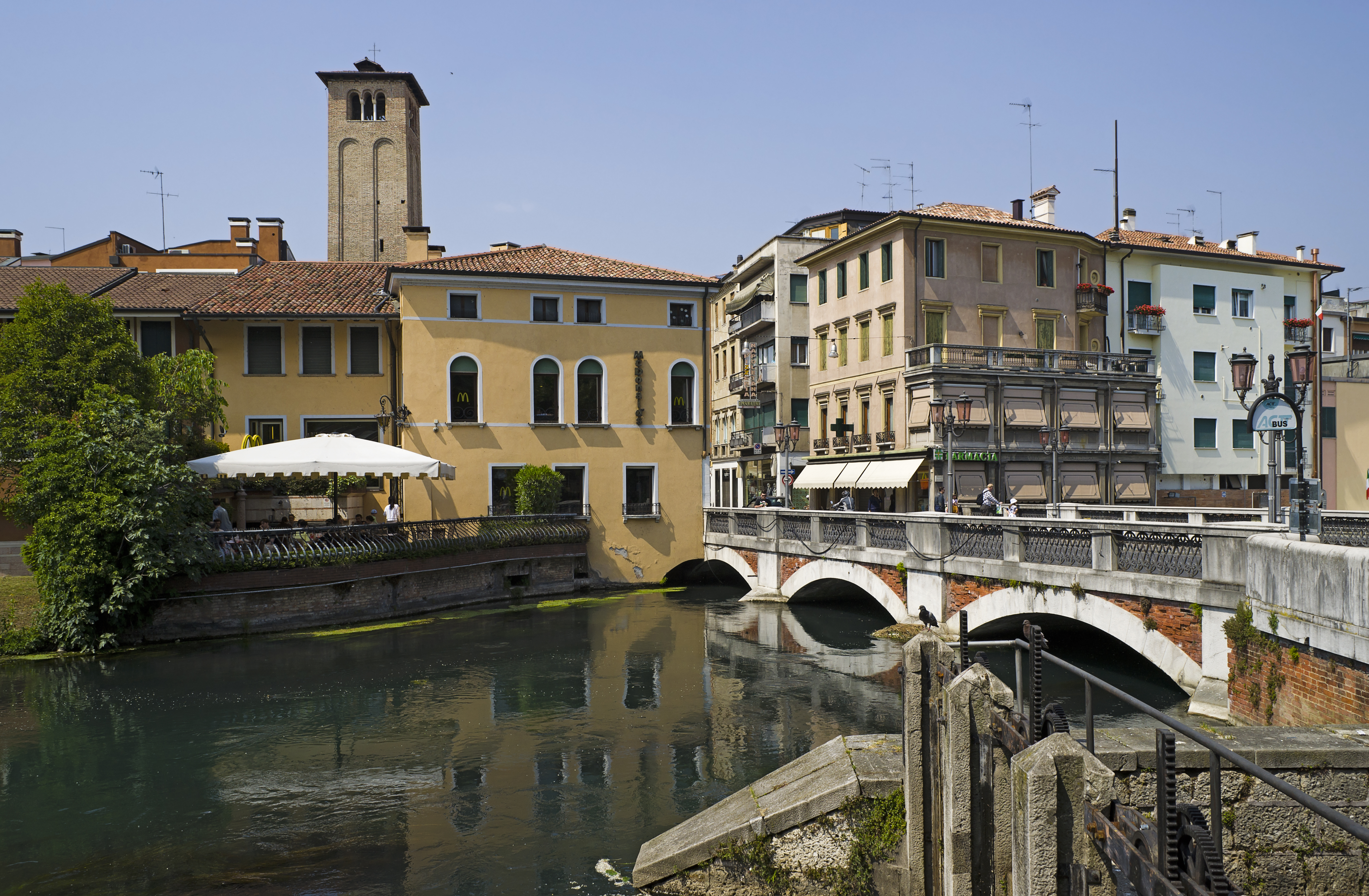
- The Sile in Treviso

Location
- Country: Italy

Physical characteristics
- Source
  - location: Vedelago in the Province of Treviso
- Mouth: Adriatic Sea
  - coordinates: 45.4790°N 12.5841°E

The Sile (Venetian: Sil) is a 95 km river in the Veneto region in north-eastern Italy. Its springs are in the municipality of Vedelago in the Province of Treviso. It flows into the northern part of the Lagoon of Venice at the mouth of the River Piave Vecchia. It receives the waters of its tributary, the Botteniga, at Treviso.

Some of the rivers in the plain of the Veneto come from springs in the nearby Alps, while others have groundwater springs in the plain. The Sile originates in the plain and therefore it is a short river. Its springs are in the area of Albaredo, Casacorba and Cavasagra in the municipality of Vedelago. The fontanasso dea Coa Longa is considered to be the main spring. Two initial branches join at Morgano. The river has an initial west-east windy course which passes through or by Santa Cristina, Quinto di Treviso, Canizzano and Treviso. In Treviso it turns in a northwest-southeast direction towards the lagoon and passes by Silea, Casier, Cendon, Lughignano, Sant'Elena, Casale sul Sile, Quarto d'Altino, Trepalade and Portegrandi.

The Sile used to flow into the lagoon at Portegrandi in the municipality of Quarto d'Altino. However, in 1683 the Republic of Venice diverted its course through the Taglio del Sile canal and made it flow into the old bed of the River Piave which at the time was dry because Venice had earlier diverted it further east. Hence, this final tract of the Piave is called Piave Vecchia, Old Piave. The Sile's old final tract into the lagoon was preserved. Its water flow was (and still is) regulated with locks. It now called Canale Silone. It continues to flow through the northern part of the lagoon through a lagunar channel whose tracts are called Canale della Taia Grande, Canale Silone, Canale Borgononi, Canale di Burano and Canale di Treporti. It reaches the Adriatic Sea through the lido inlet. It flows between the islands of Torcello, Mazzorbo and Burano, between the Palude dei Mortesini, Palude i Cona and Palude dei Laghi marshes and between the Palude della Centrega and Palude di Burano mashes. There are barene (saltmarshes) along this lagunar course.

During Antiquity the Sile was connected to port town of Altinum through an eastern tract of the Siloncello canal which went close to its mouth at Portegrandi. At the time the River Piave must have flowed into the Sile. The Piave was a preferred route for the transport of wood from the forests of Cadore towards Altinum as attested by an inscription found in Feltre. Thus, this canal was of strategic importance for Altinum's supply of wood.

The eastern tract of the Siloncello canal also turned south before reaching Portegrandi and reached the Palude di Cona in the Lagoon of Venice. Through this Altinum was connected with the lagunar channel of the Sile. This was a navigable route that gave Altinum's sea trade access to the Adriatic Sea. Altinum was eventually abandoned and its inhabitants moved to the islands of the northern part of the Lagoon of Venice. Torcello became the main administrative, religious and trading centre of these islands. It was the seat of the governor of the northern part of the lagoon. Its bishopric covered the whole of this area. Torcello and other islands in the northern part of the lagoon were later abandoned because of environmental degradation in the area and malaria and because many families moved to the nascent Venice, which became the commercial and political heart of the lagoon.

In Dante’s “Third Sphere” of the Paradiso of his Divine Comedy, Cunizza da Romano predicts the fate of Riccardo da Camino, who was apparently murdered at a chess game. Dante located this event at the confluence of the Sile and the Cagnan, one of the branches the River Botteniga splits into when it reaches the gates of the town wall of Treviso:

e dove Sile e Cagnan s'accompagna,

tal signoreggia e va con la testa alta,

che già per lui carpir si fa la ragna.

— Dante Alighieri, Paradiso, Canto IX, lines 49-51

(And where the Cagnan and the Sile meet,

there’s one in power who goes with head held high:

the net to catch him is already made.)
