= Lino Selvatico =

Italian painter (1872–1924)

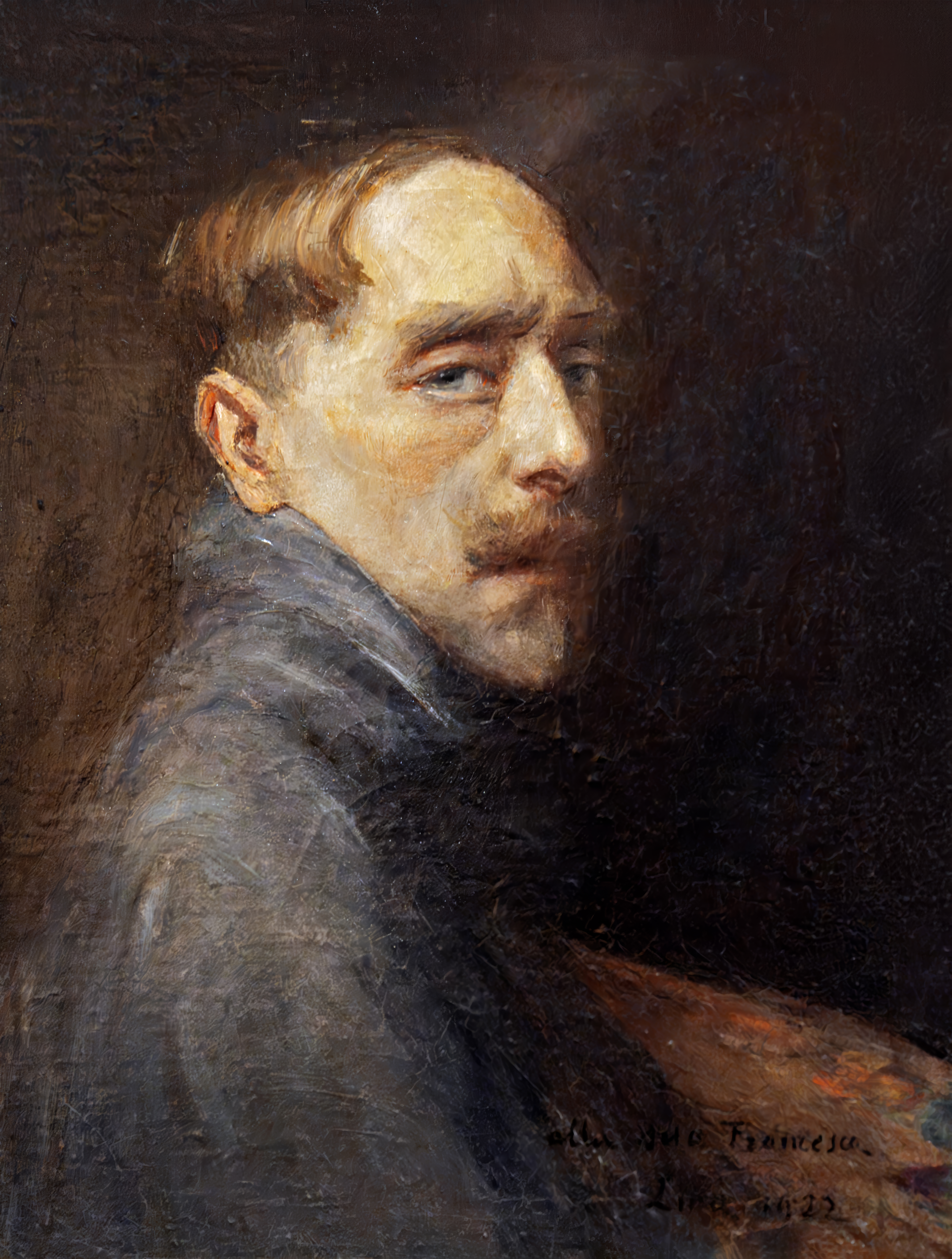
- Self-portrait 1922
- Born: 20 July 1872; Padua, Kingdom of Italy
- Died: 25 July 1924 (aged 52); Roncade, Province of Treviso, Kingdom of Italy
- Known for: Painting

Lino Selvatico (July 20, 1872 in Padua – July 25, 1924 in Roncade, Province of Treviso) was an Italian painter.

His father, Riccardo (born 1849), was a lawyer, poet, comedic dramatist, and politician, who was Mayor of Venice from 1890 to 1895. He intended his son to become a lawyer and legislator. Lino's brother, Luigi Selvatico (1873–1938), was also a painter. Luigi was nicknamed il gobbo Selvatico due to his physical ailment. Lino was a pupil of Cesare Laurenti, and was also influenced by his friend Ettore Tito. He also was known for art criticism. He exhibited two portraits at the third Venice Biennale in 1899. In 1926, the Biennale had a posthumous exhibit of 45 of his works, and in 1935, sixteen of his works. His works are displayed in the Moderna Art Galleries of Milan, Rome, Trieste, Udine, and Venice. He completed portraits of Countess Annina Morosini (1908, Venice, Galleria d'arte moderna) and the actress Emma Gramatica (1911, Piacenza, Galleria d'arte moderna Ricci-Oddi).

His brother Luigi participated in the 1897 Biennale of Venice.

== Gallery ==
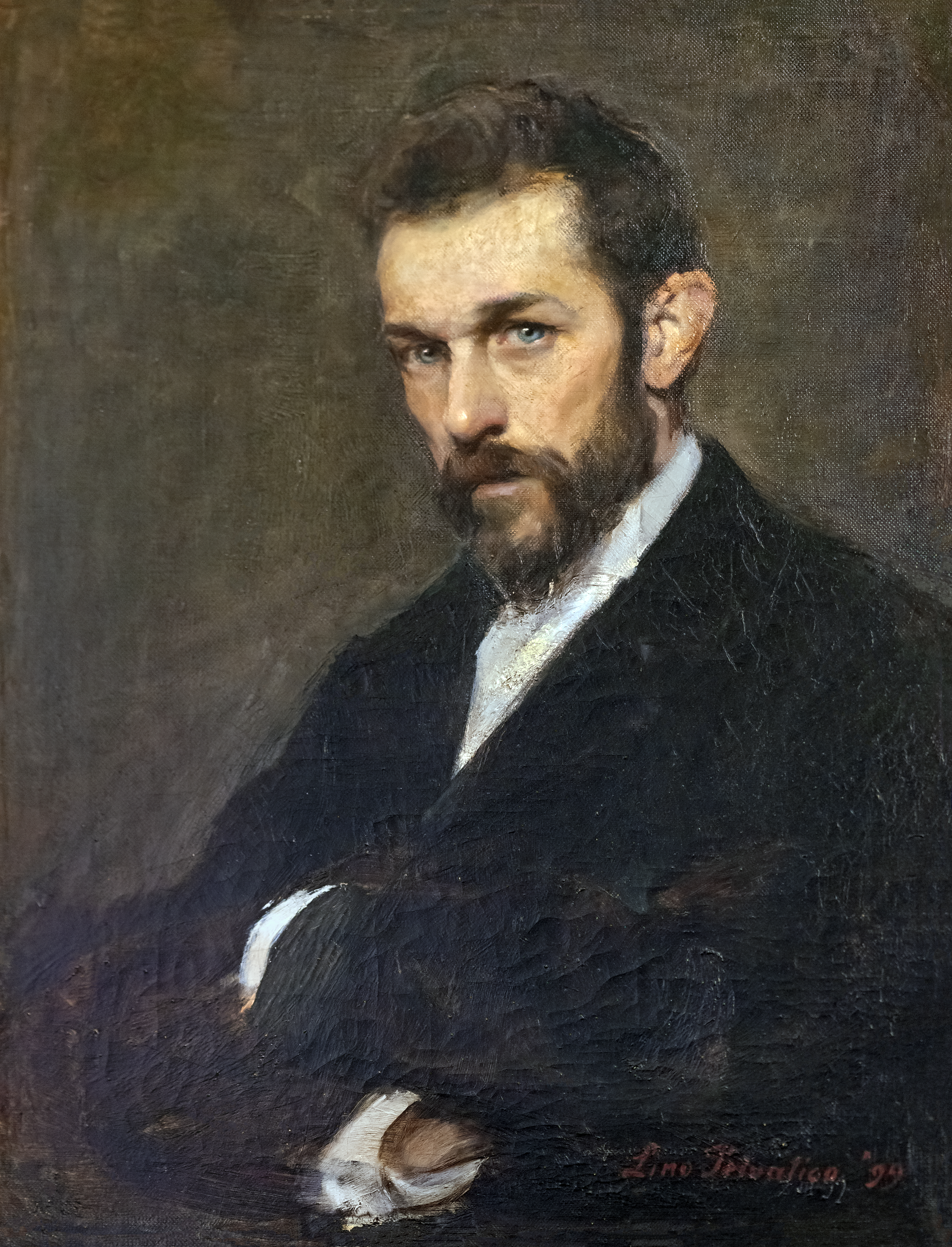
Portrait of Giovanni Bordiga (1899)

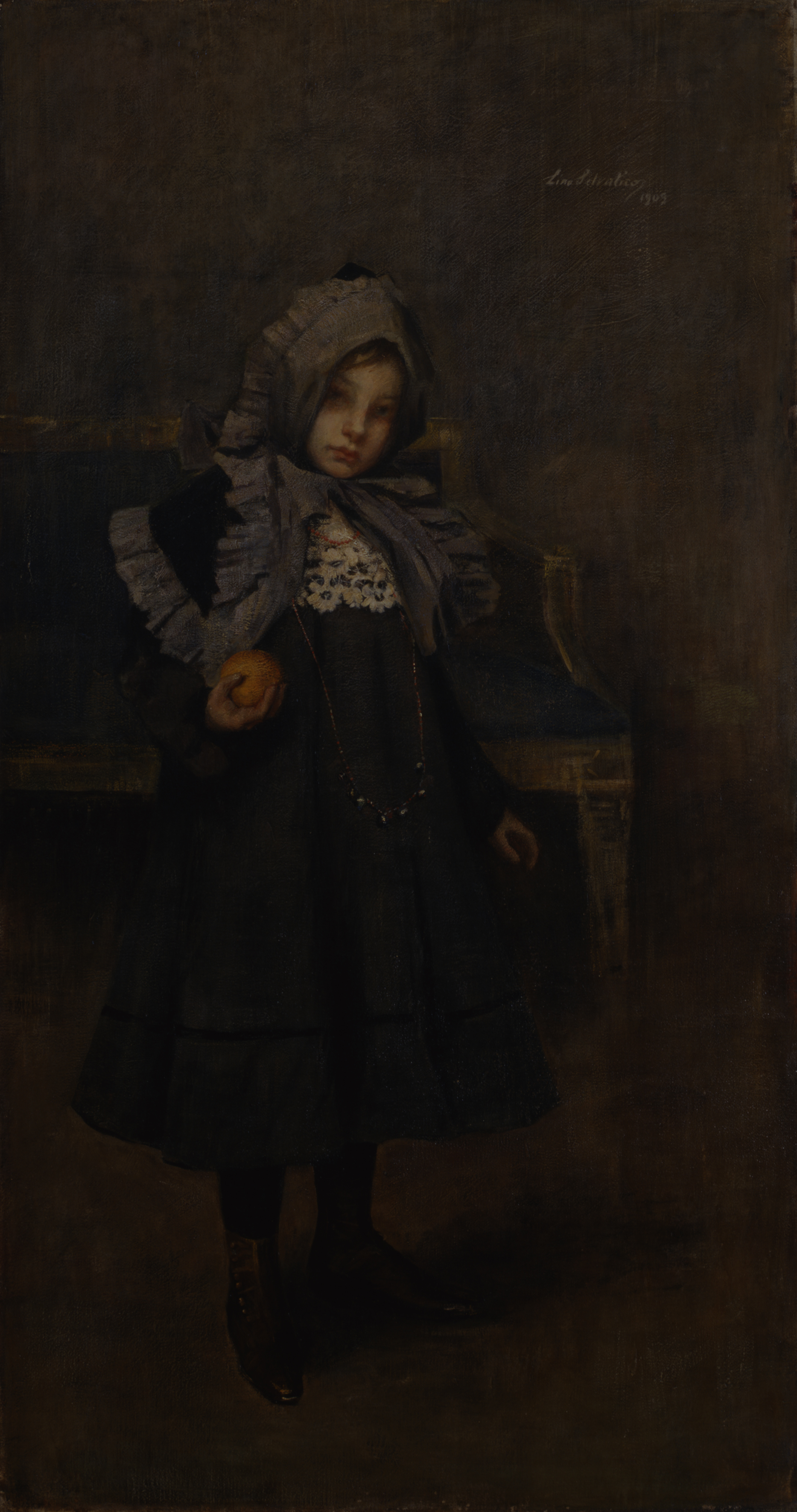
The gray hood (1903)

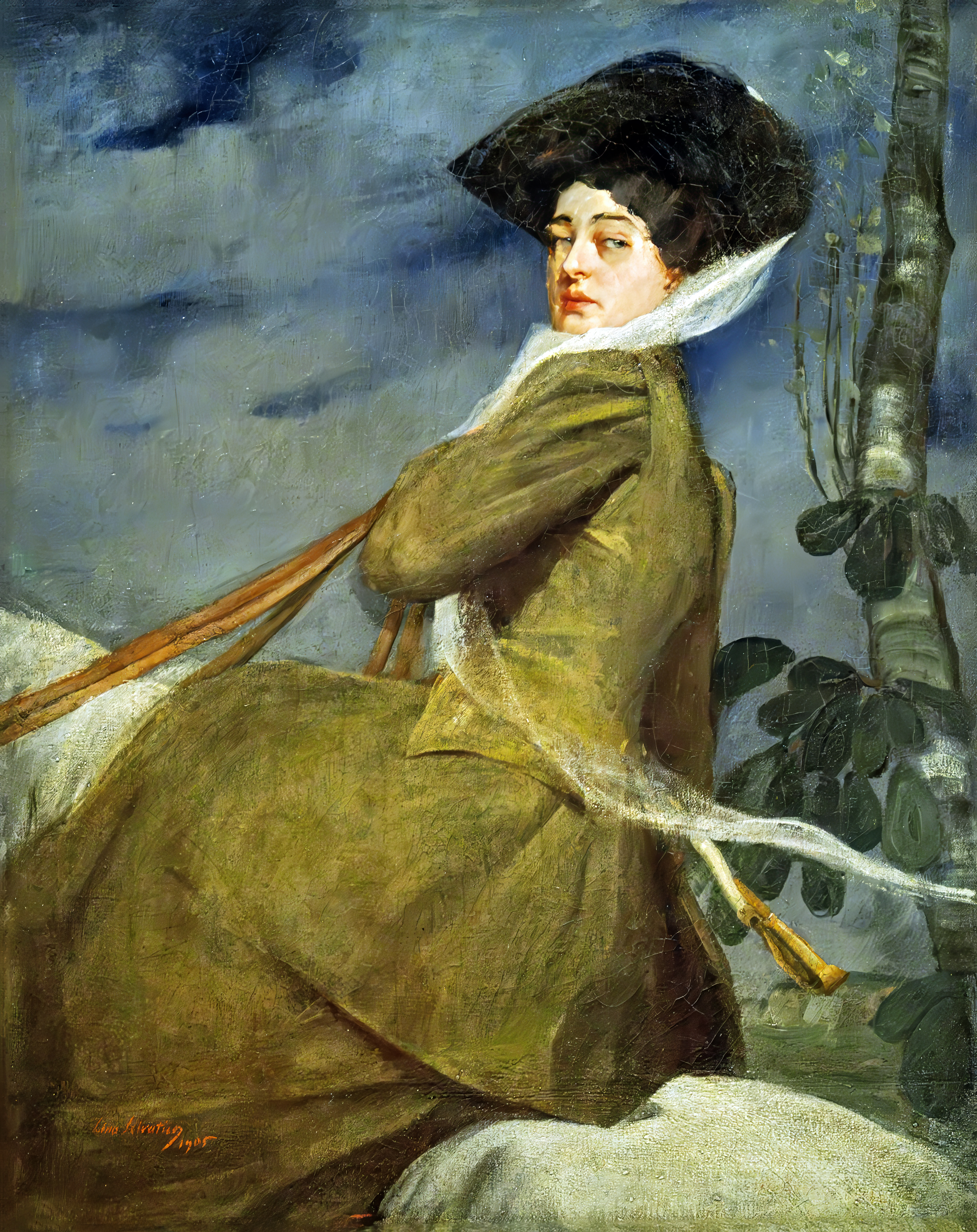
Horsewoman (1905)

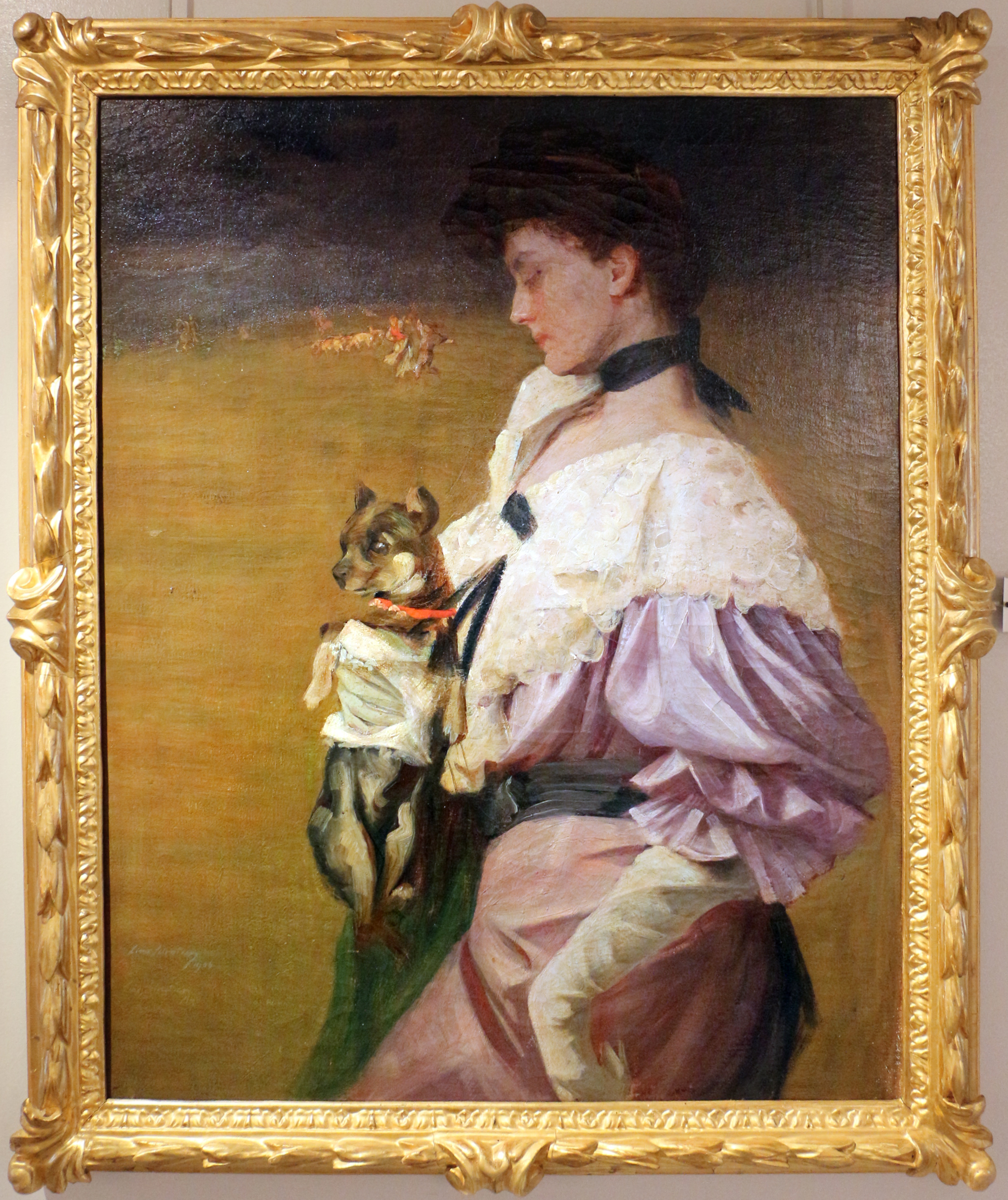
Nina and Ninetto. Female portrait with dog (1906)

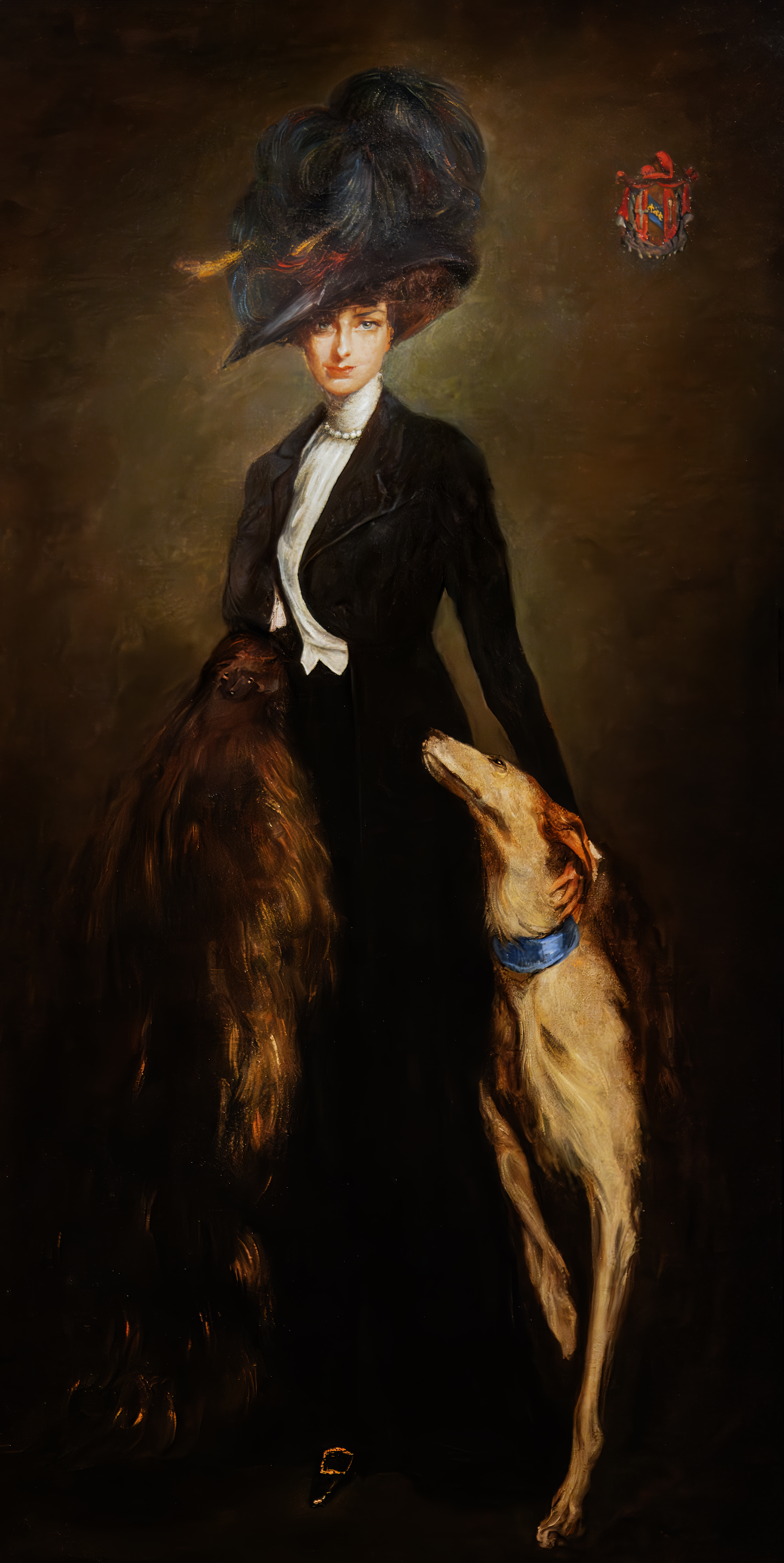
Portrait of the Countess Anna Morosini (1908)

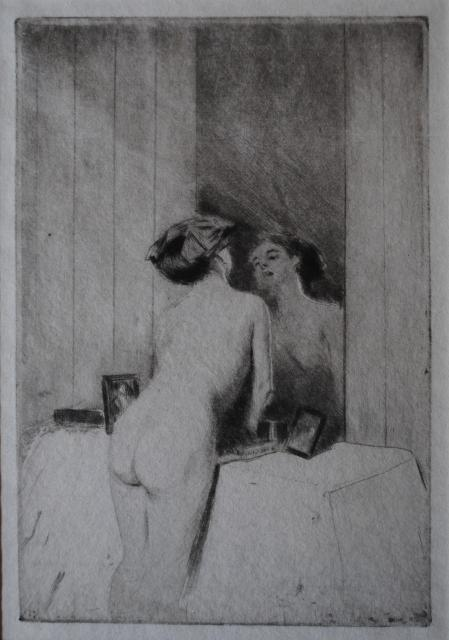
At the mirror (c.1910)

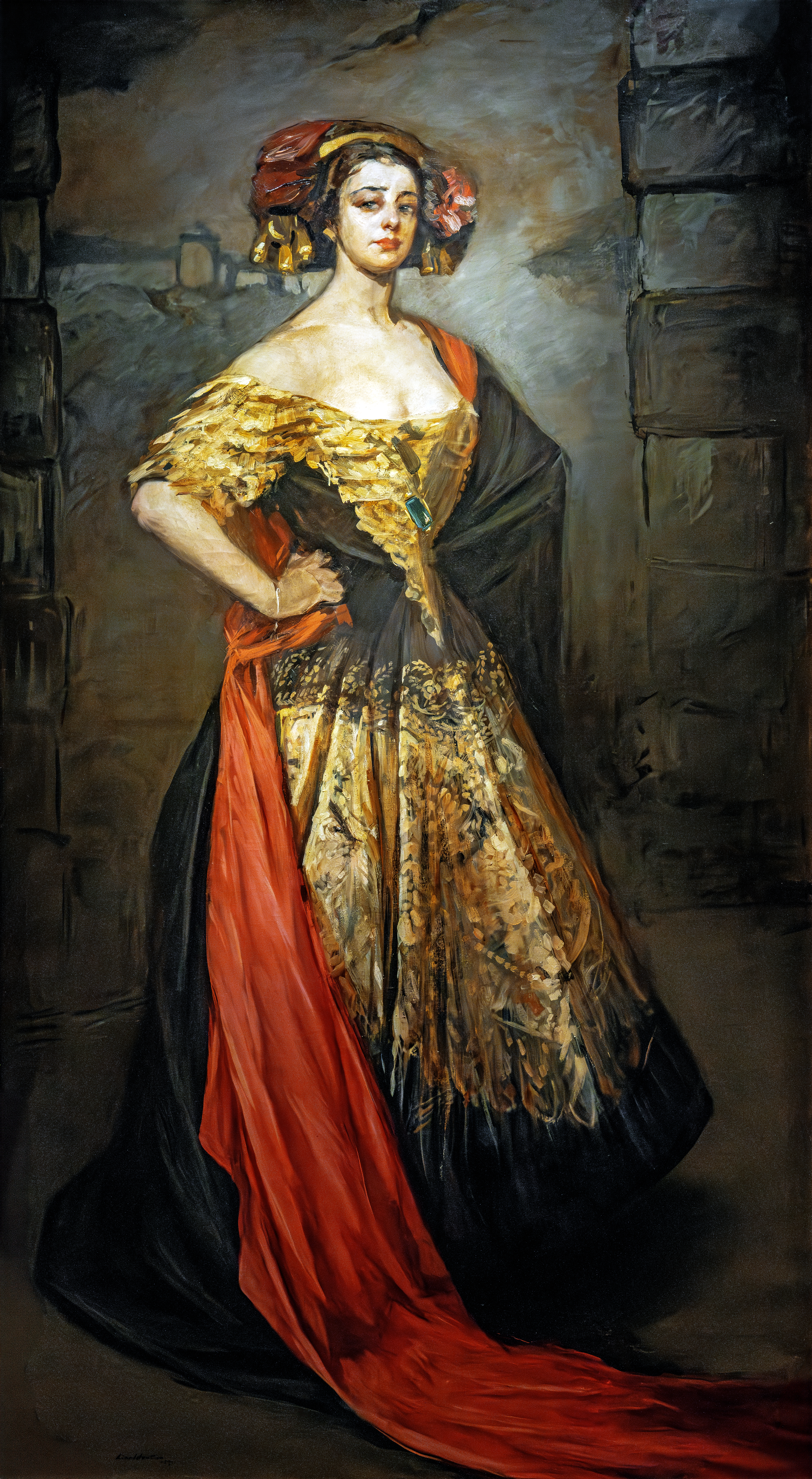
Portrait of the dancer Rita Sacchetto (1911)

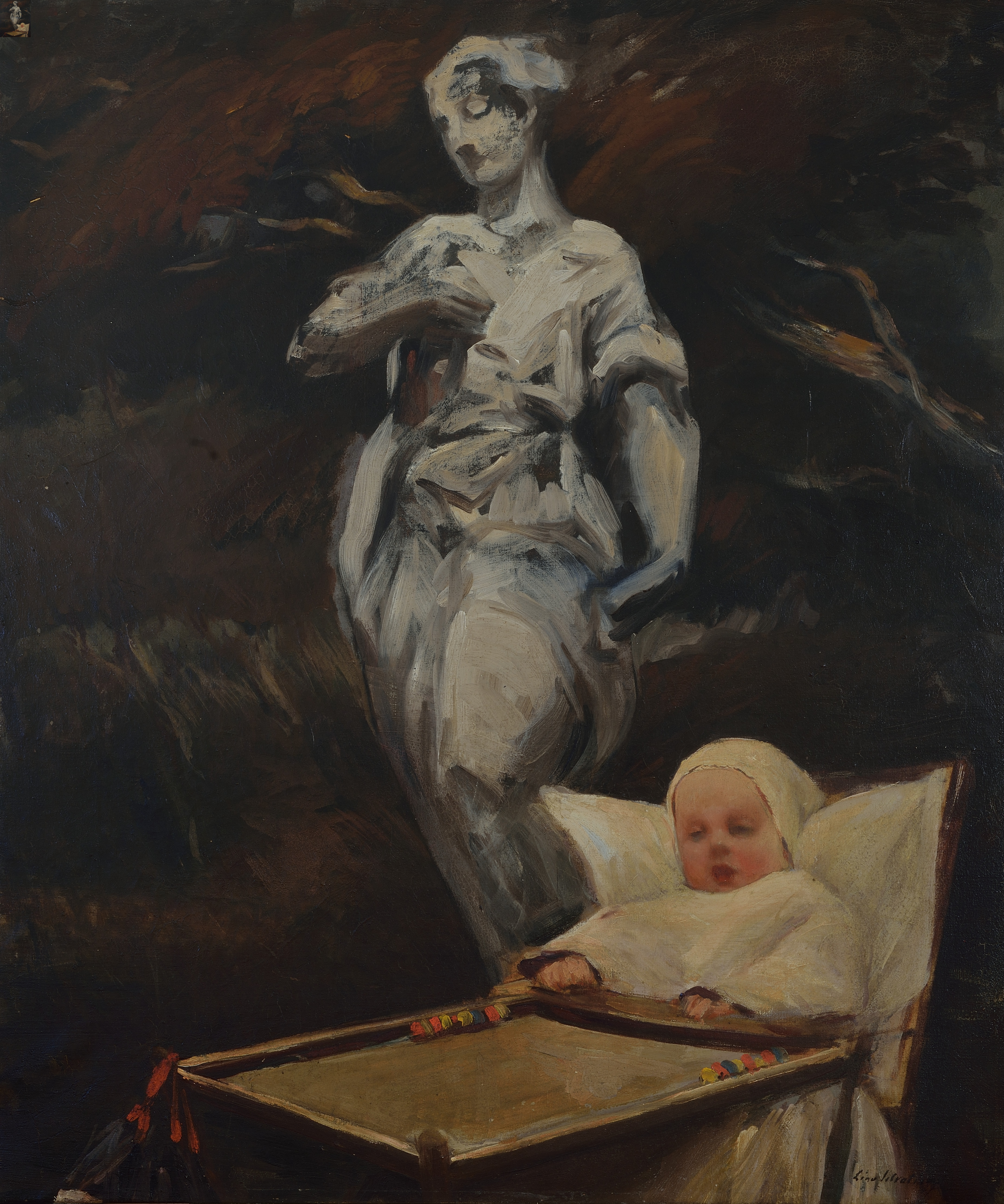
Portrait of my baby (1915)

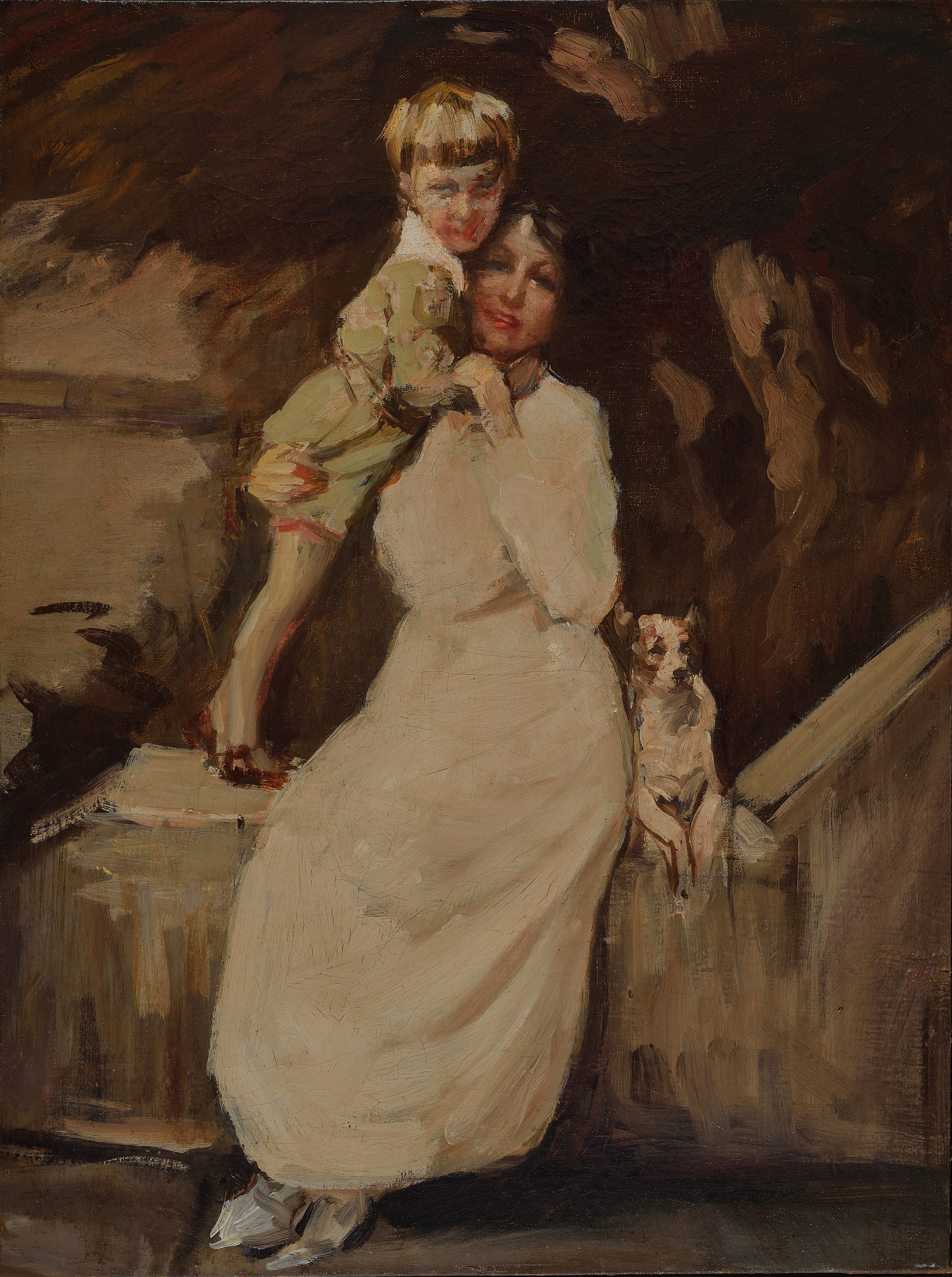
Motherhood (Sketch for portrait) (c.1917)

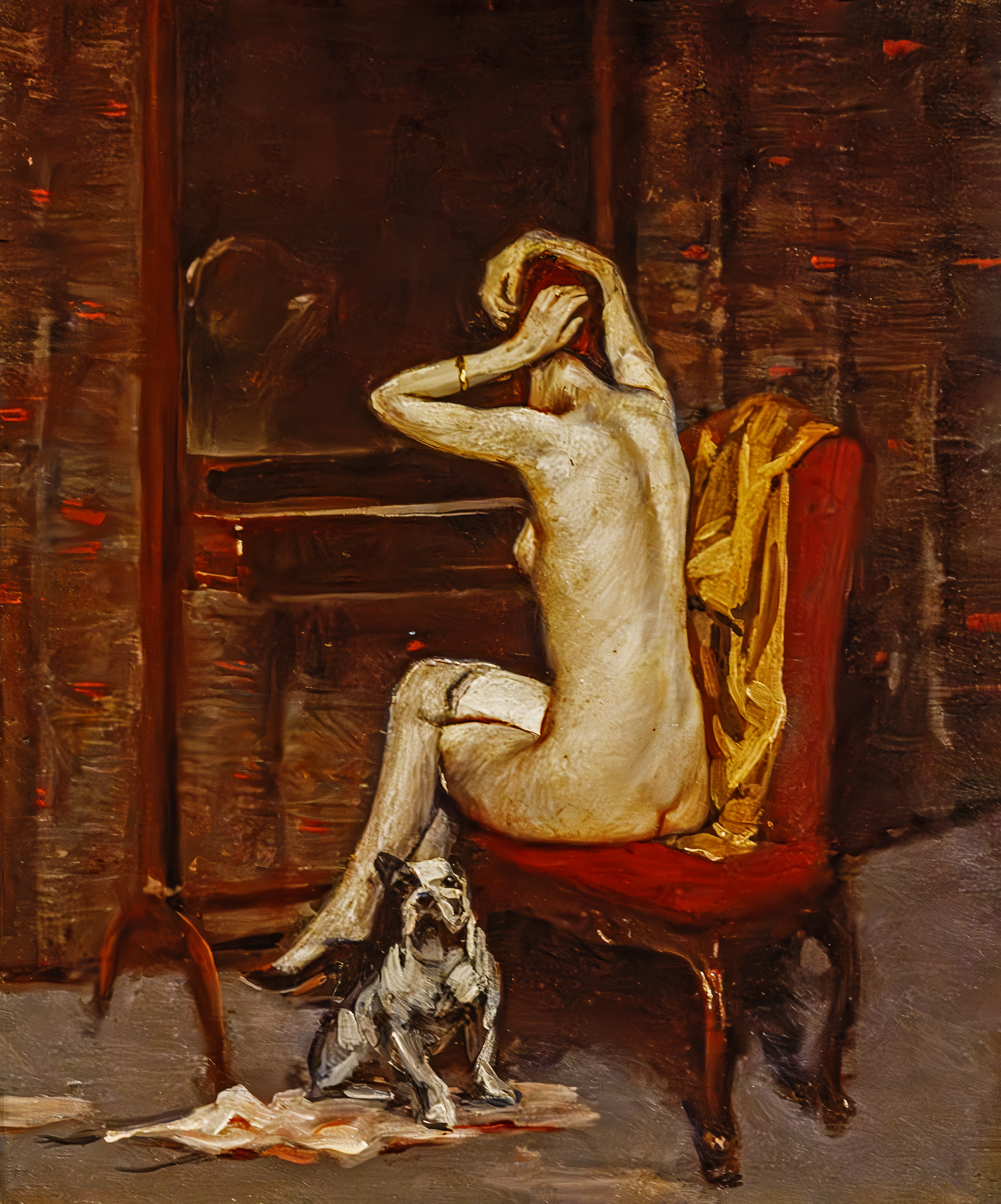
Sketch (with dog) (c.1920)

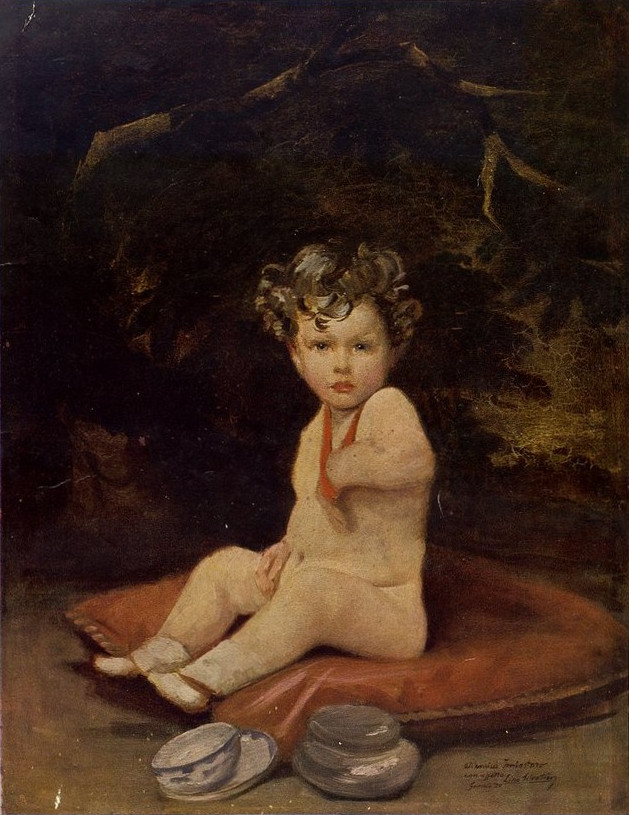
Portrait of a girl (1920)

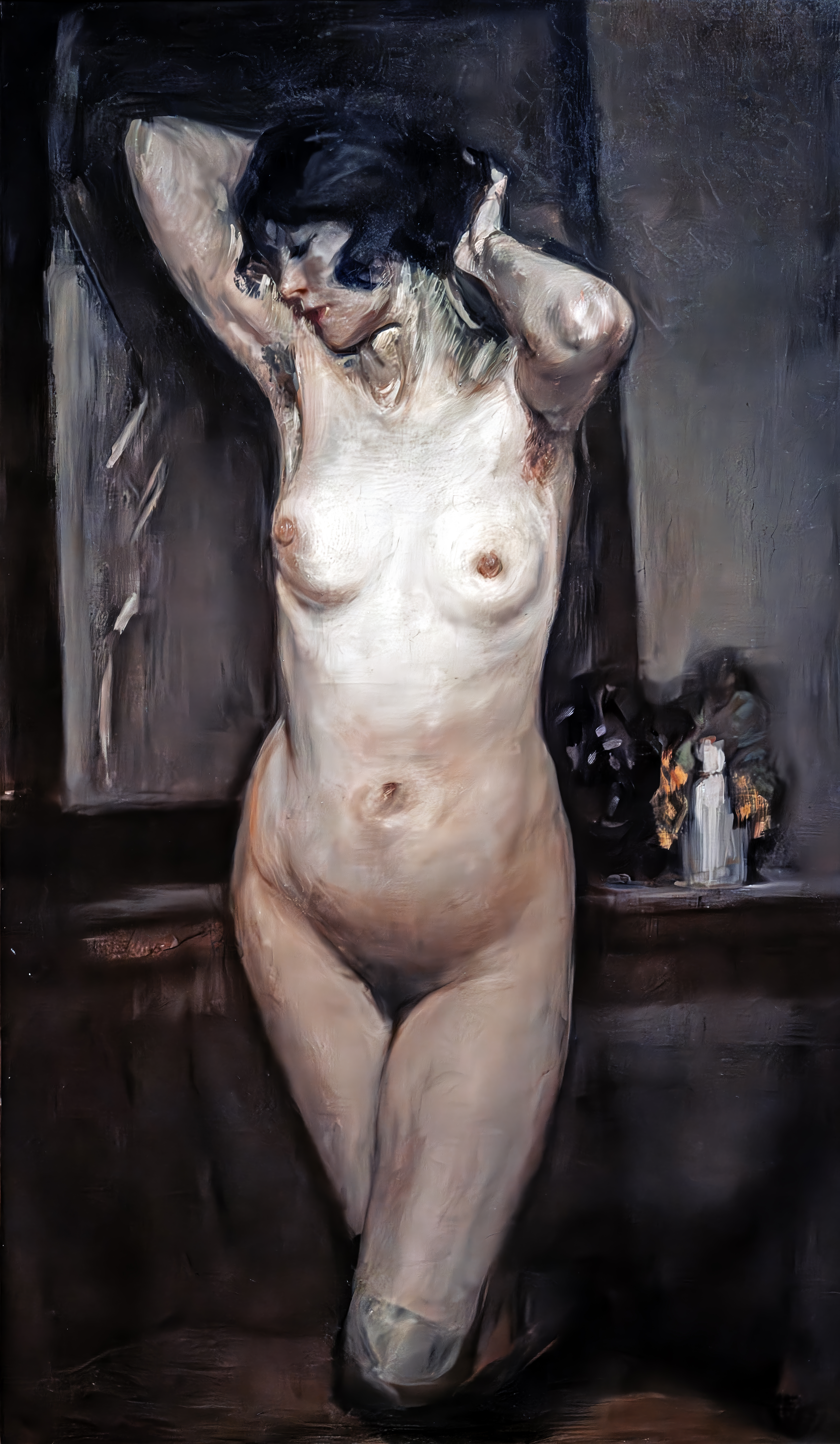
Nude (c.1922)

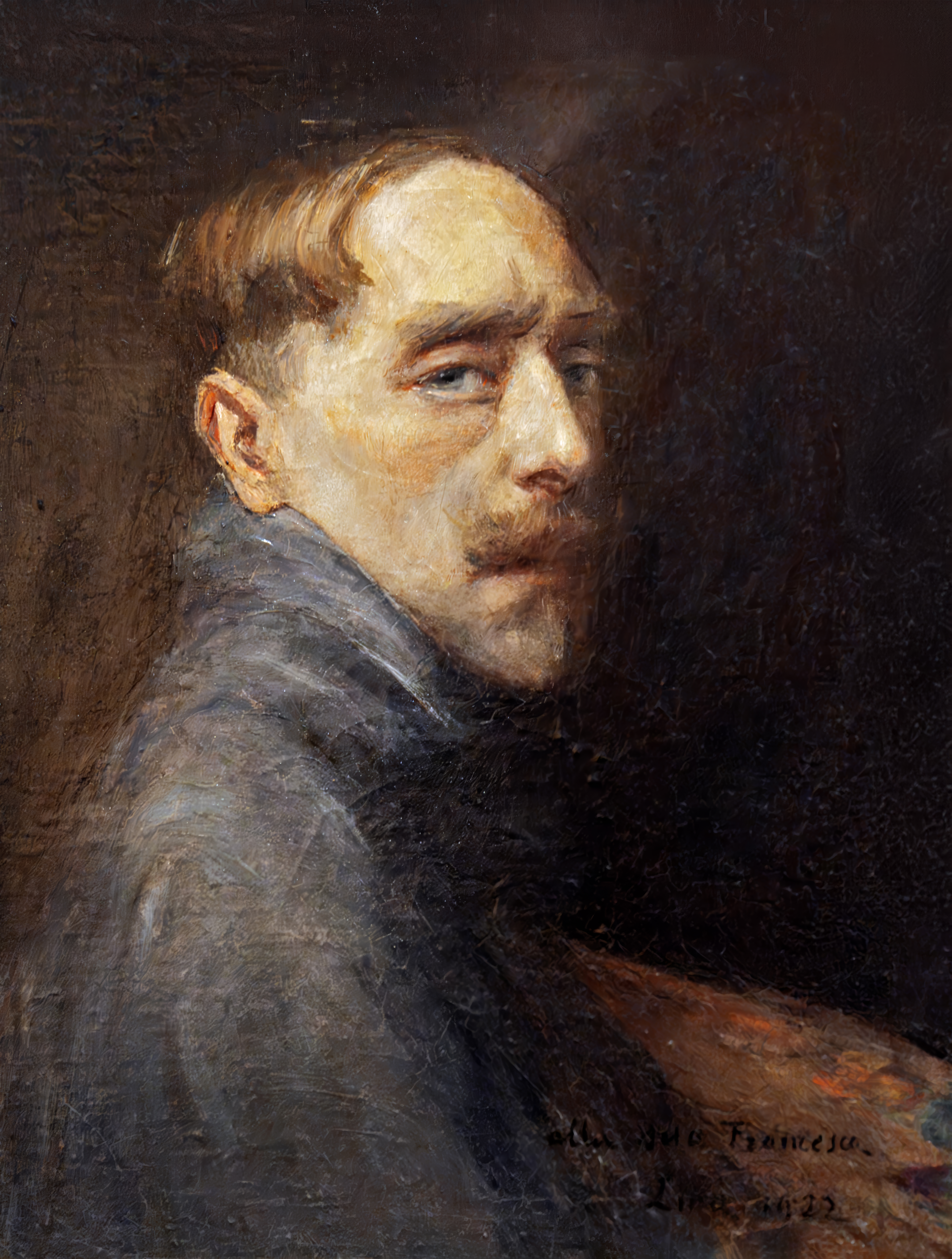
Self-portrait (1922)

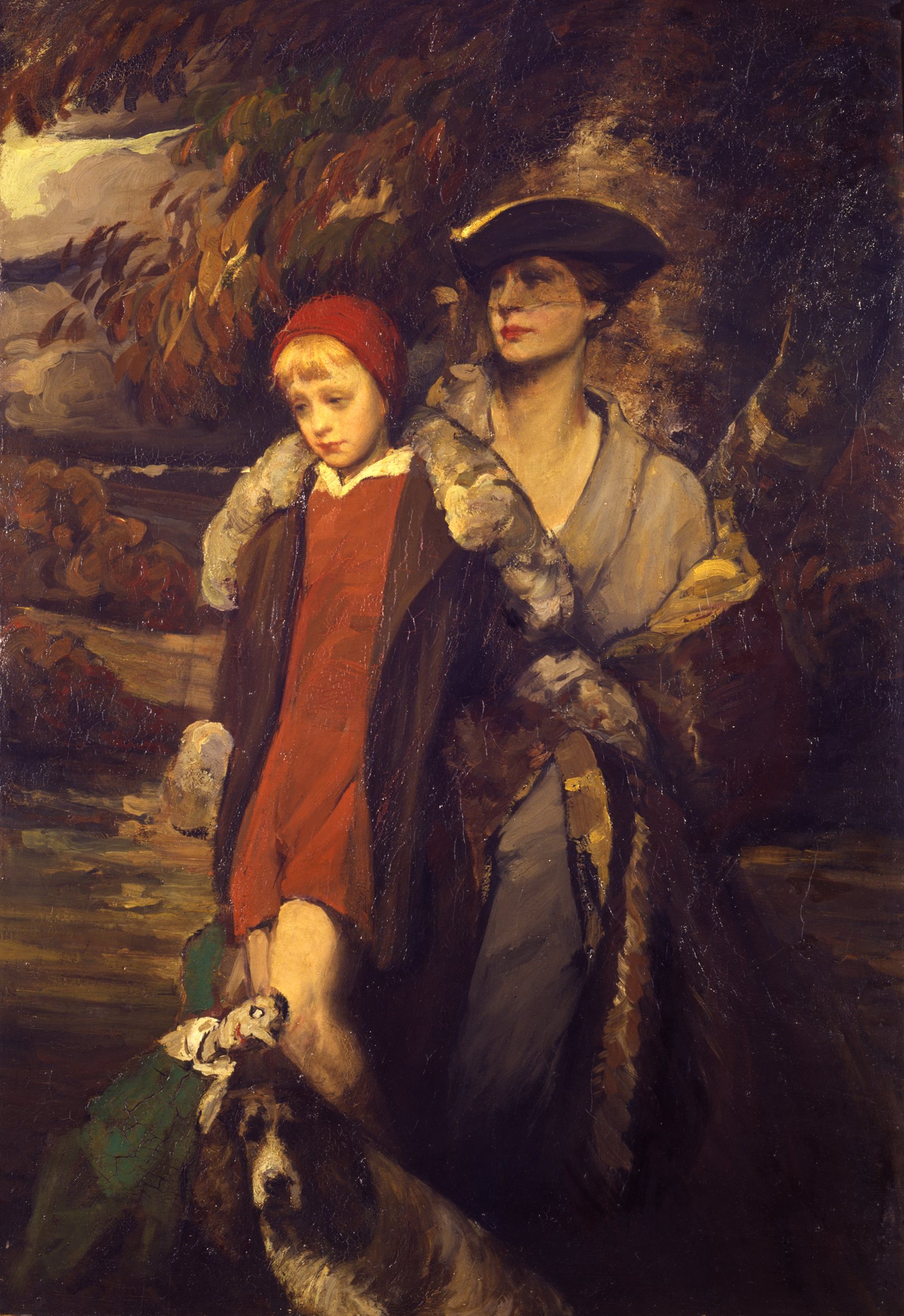
Mother and child (1922)

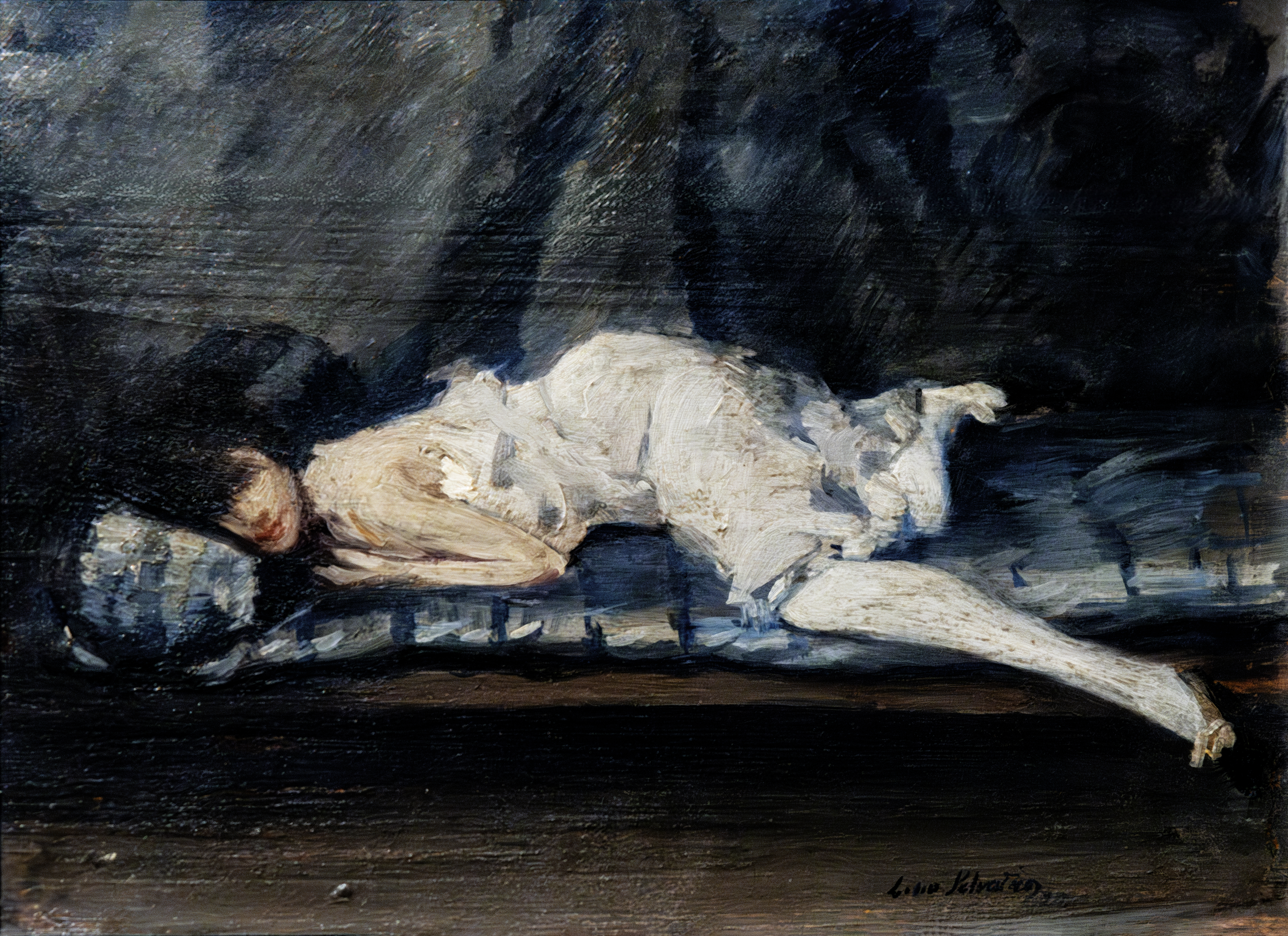
Sleeping woman (1922)

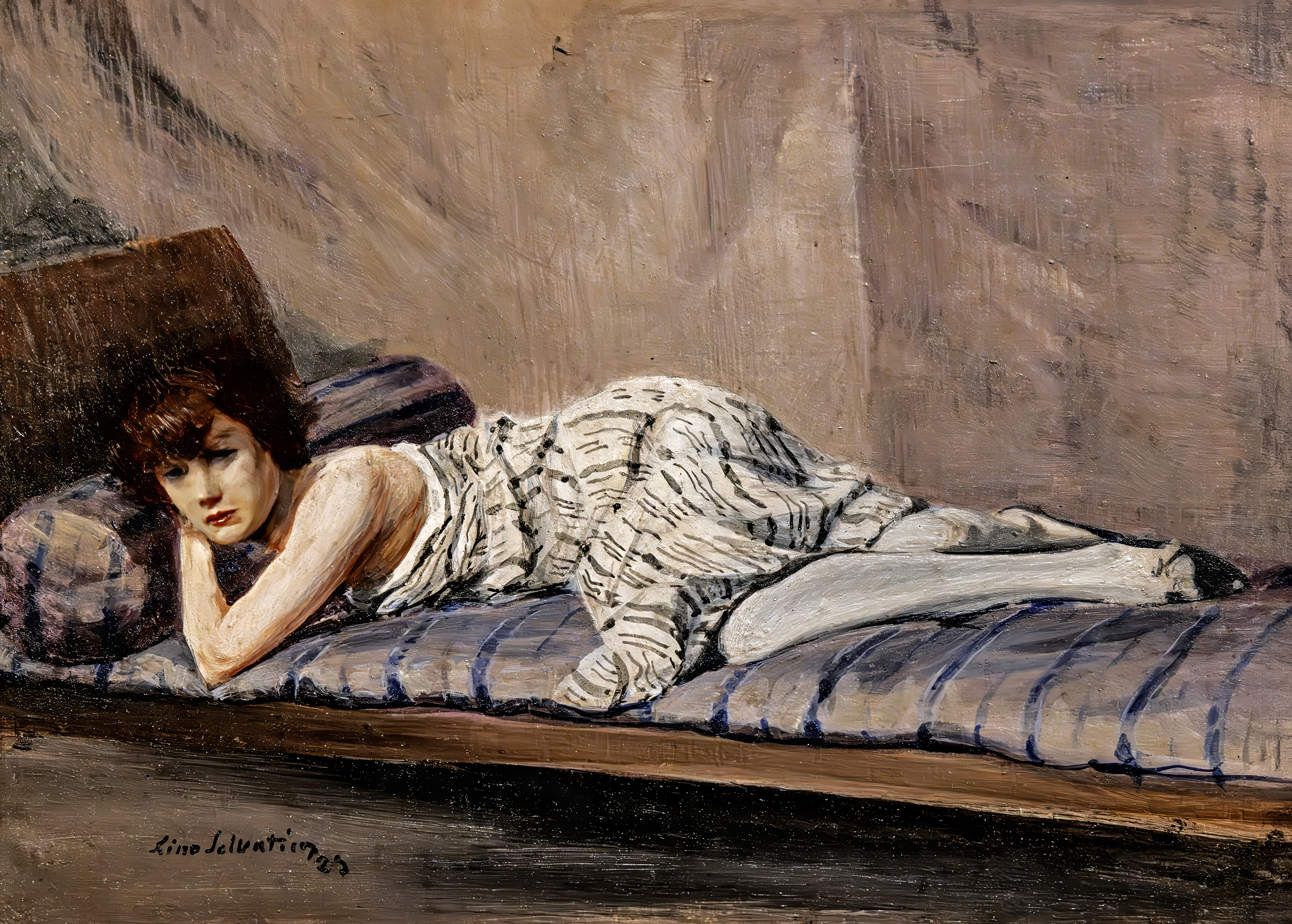
The purple pillow (1923)

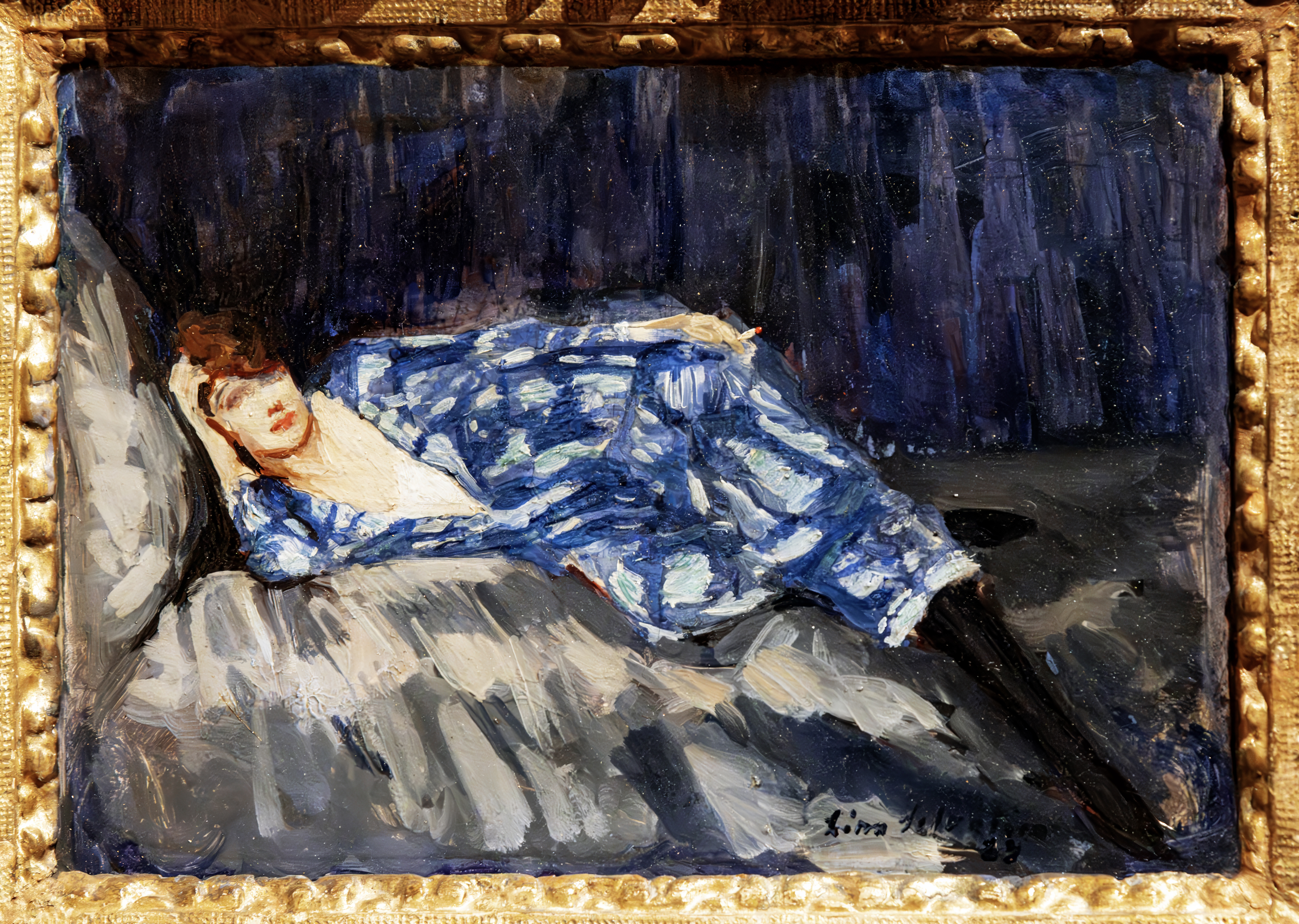
Woman with cigarette (1923)

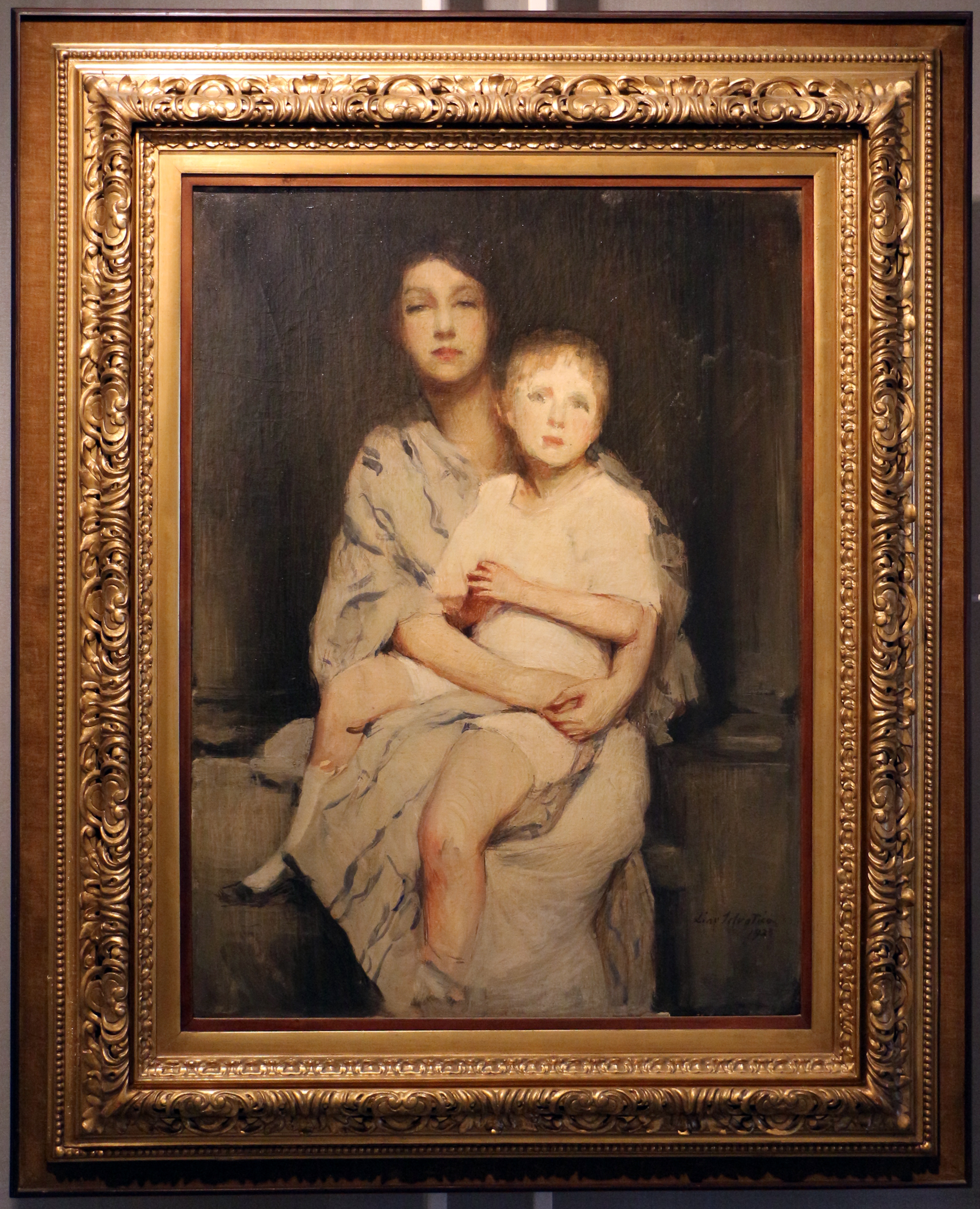
Portrait of a woman with child (1923)

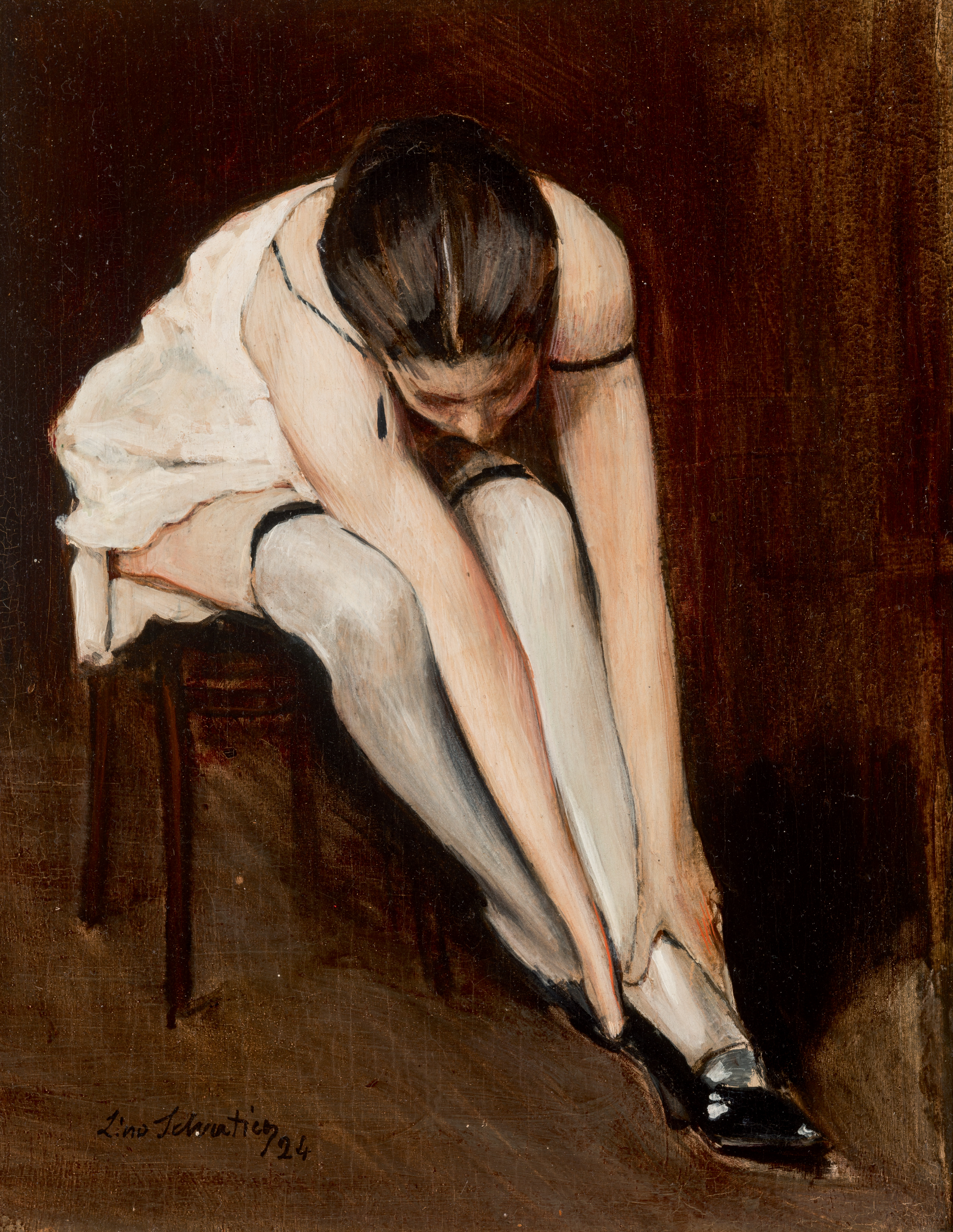
The little shoe (The slipper) (1924)

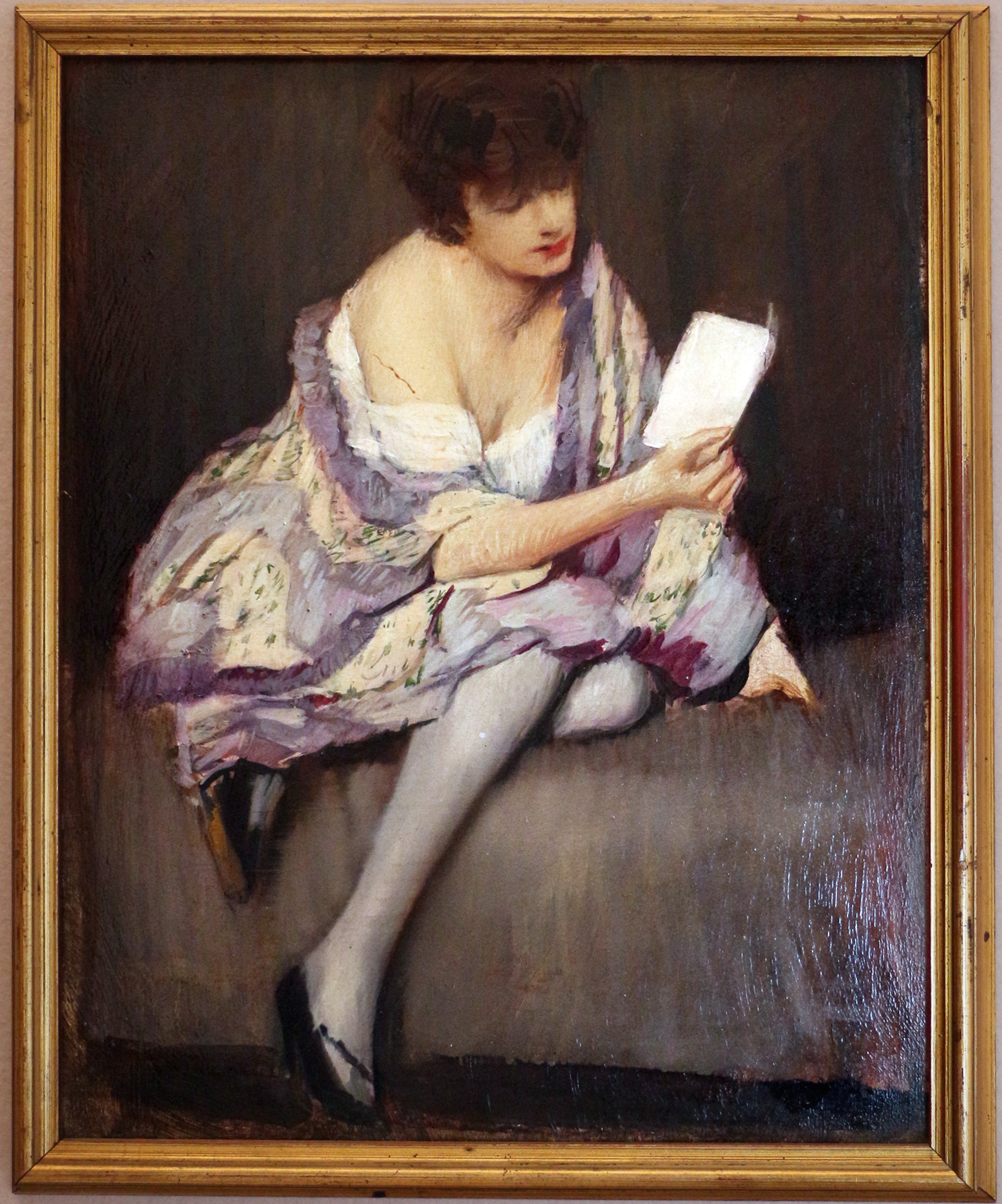
The letter
