= List of presidents of the Province of Treviso =

President of the Province of Treviso
- Presidente della Provincia di Treviso
- Incumbent; Marco Donadel since 2 February 2026
- Term length: 4 years
- Inaugural holder: Leopoldo Minesso
- Formation: 1889

The president of the Province of Treviso is the head of the provincial government in Treviso, Veneto, Italy. The president oversees the administration of the province, coordinates the activities of the municipalities, and represents the province in regional and national matters.

Since February 2026, the office has been held by Marco Donadel of Lega.

== List ==
=== Presidents of the Provincial Deputation (1889–1926) ===
No.	Portrait	Name	Term of office		Party
No.	Portrait	Name	Start	End	Party
1		Leopoldo Minesso	1889	1906	
2		Leopoldo Piazza	1906	1907	
3		Daniele Montemurici	1907	1912	
4		Gioacchino Wiel	1912	1914	
5		Giovanni Della Favera	1914	?	

=== Presidents of the Provincial Deputation (1945–1951) ===
Nº	Portrait	Name	Term of office		Party
Nº	Portrait	Name	Start	End	Party
1		Antonio Mazza	28 April 1945	1946	Christian Democracy
2		Ruggero Lombardi	1946	1948	Christian Democracy
3		Mario Ferracin	1948	1951	Christian Democracy

=== Presidents of the Province (1951–present) ===
Nº	Portrait	Name	Term of office		Party
Nº	Portrait	Name	Start	End	Party
1		Mario Ferracin	1951	1956	Christian Democracy
2		Bruno Marton	1956	1960	Christian Democracy
2		Bruno Marton	1960	1965	Christian Democracy
3		Pietro Ferracin	1965	1970	Christian Democracy
3		Pietro Ferracin	1970	1971	Christian Democracy
4		Carlo Bernini	1971	1975	Christian Democracy
4		Carlo Bernini	1975	1980	Christian Democracy
–		Luigi Carraro (acting)	1980	1980	Christian Democracy
5		Giuseppe Marton	1980	1985	Christian Democracy
6		Lino Innocenti	1985	1990	Christian Democracy
7		Giacomo Dalla Longa	1990	1993	Christian Democracy
8		Domenico Citron	1993	1995	Christian Democracy
9		Giovanni Mazzonetto	10 May 1995	2 February 1998	Liga Veneta–Lega Nord
–		Francesco Cabrini (acting)	2 February 1998	8 June 1998	Independent
10		Luca Zaia	8 June 1998	11 June 2002	Liga Veneta–Lega Nord
10		Luca Zaia	11 June 2002	10 June 2005	Liga Veneta–Lega Nord
–		Leonardo Muraro	10 June 2005	30 May 2006	Liga Veneta–Lega Nord
11		Leonardo Muraro	30 May 2006	18 May 2011	Liga Veneta–Lega Nord
11		Leonardo Muraro	18 May 2011	18 September 2016	Liga Veneta–Lega Nord
13		Stefano Marcon	18 September 2016	18 December 2021	Liga Veneta–Lega
13		Stefano Marcon	18 December 2021	2 February 2026	Liga Veneta–Lega
14		Marco Donadel	2 February 2026	Incumbent	Liga Veneta–Lega

== Sources ==
- "Storia amministrativa dell'ente". Ministero dell'Interno.
- Agostini, Filiberto (2012). Il governo locale nel Veneto all'indomani della liberazione. Milan: FrancoAngeli.
- Menichini, Piera (2005). "I presidenti delle Province dall'Unità alla Grande guerra: repertorio analitico". Storia Amministrazione Costituzione (13): 294–295.
