= Eaunes =

- Commune
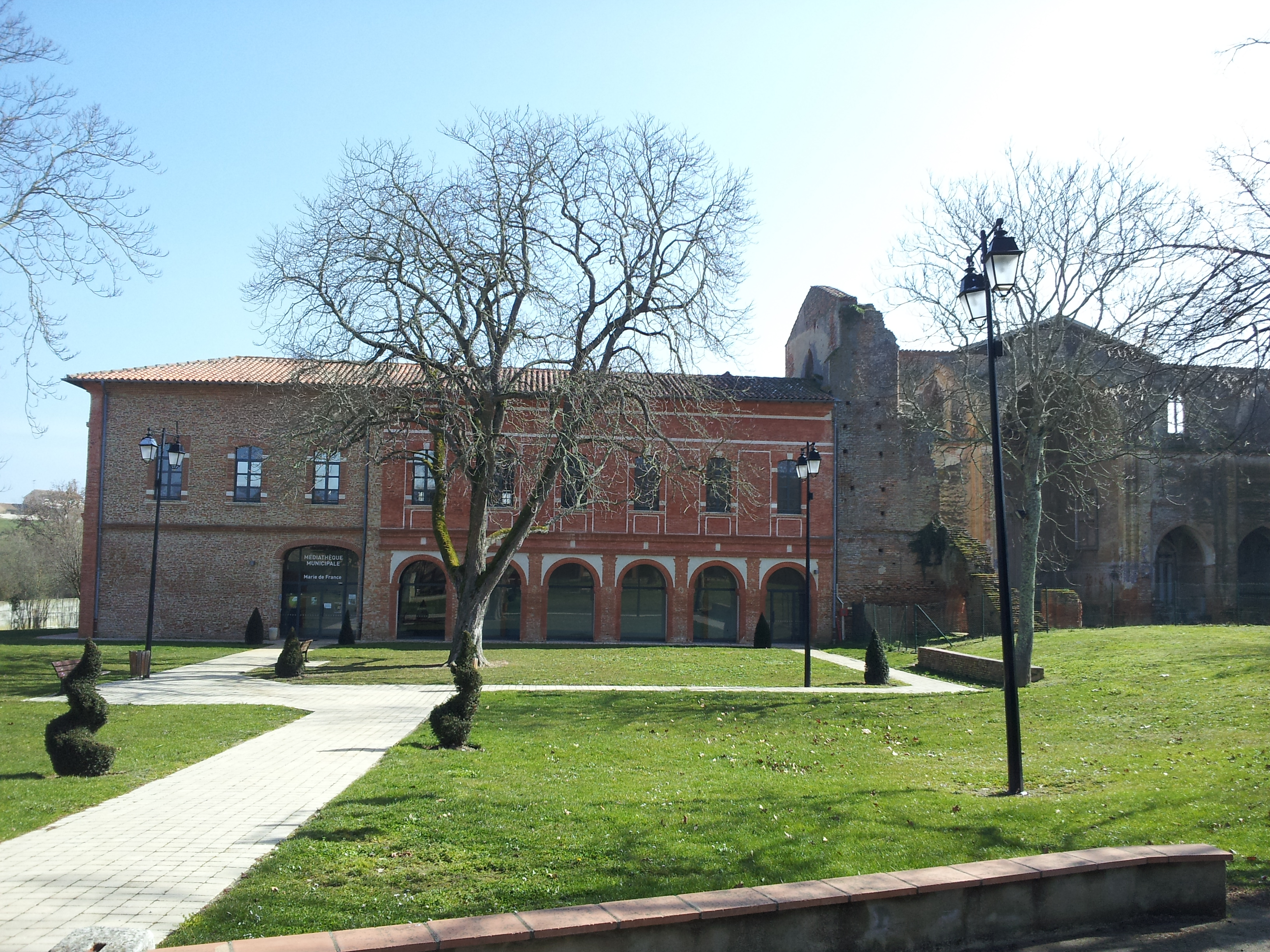
- Abbey of La Clarté-Dieu

- Coat of arms
- Location of Eaunes
- Location within France Location within Occitanie
- Coordinates: 43°25′20″N 1°21′15″E
- Country: France
- Region: Occitania
- Department: Haute-Garonne
- Arrondissement: Muret
- Canton: Portet-sur-Garonne
- Intercommunality: Le Muretain Agglo

Government
  - Mayor (2020–2026): Alain Sottil
- Area^{1}: 14.95 km^{2} (5.77 sq mi)
- Elevation: 200 m (660 ft)
- Highest elevation: 290 m (950 ft)
- Lowest elevation: 168 m (551 ft)
- Population (2023): 6,539
  - Density: 437.4/km^{2} (1,133/sq mi)
- Time zone: UTC+01:00 (CET)
  - Summer (DST): UTC+02:00 (CEST)
- INSEE/Postal code: 31165 /31600
- ^{1} French Land Register data, which excludes lakes, ponds, glaciers > 1 km^{2} (0.386 sq mi or 247 acres) and river estuaries.

Eaunes (French pronunciation: [on]; Occitan: Èunas) is a commune in the Haute-Garonne department in southwestern France.

== Population ==
The inhabitants of the commune are known as Eaunois or Eaunoises in French.

Historical population
Year	Pop.	±% p.a.
1968	527	—
1975	1,488	+15.98%
1982	2,347	+6.73%
1990	2,550	+1.04%
1999	3,389	+3.21%
2007	4,239	+2.84%
2012	5,651	+5.92%
2017	6,162	+1.75%
2023	6,539	+0.99%
Source: INSEE

== Twin towns ==
Eaunes is twinned with:

- Casier, Italy
- Albalate de Cinca, Spain

== See also ==
- Communes of the Haute-Garonne department
