= Marco Donadel (politician) =

Italian politician (born 1981)

President of the Province of Treviso
- Incumbent
- Assumed office 2 February 2026
- Preceded by: Stefano Marcon

Mayor of Roncade
- Incumbent
- Assumed office 9 June 2024
- Preceded by: Pieranna Zottarelli

Personal details
- Born: 12 September 1981 (age 44) Treviso, Veneto, Italy
- Party: Lega Nord; Lega

Marco Donadel (born 12 September 1981) is an Italian politician serving as president of the Province of Treviso since 2026. He has served as mayor of Roncade since 2024.

In the 2026 provincial election, Donadel, supported by the centre-right coalition of Lega, Forza Italia and Brothers of Italy, was elected president of the Province of Treviso with 58.32% of the weighted vote, defeating centre-left and civic candidate Luca Durighetto, who received 41.68%.
