= Cherubino Kirchmayr =

Italian painter

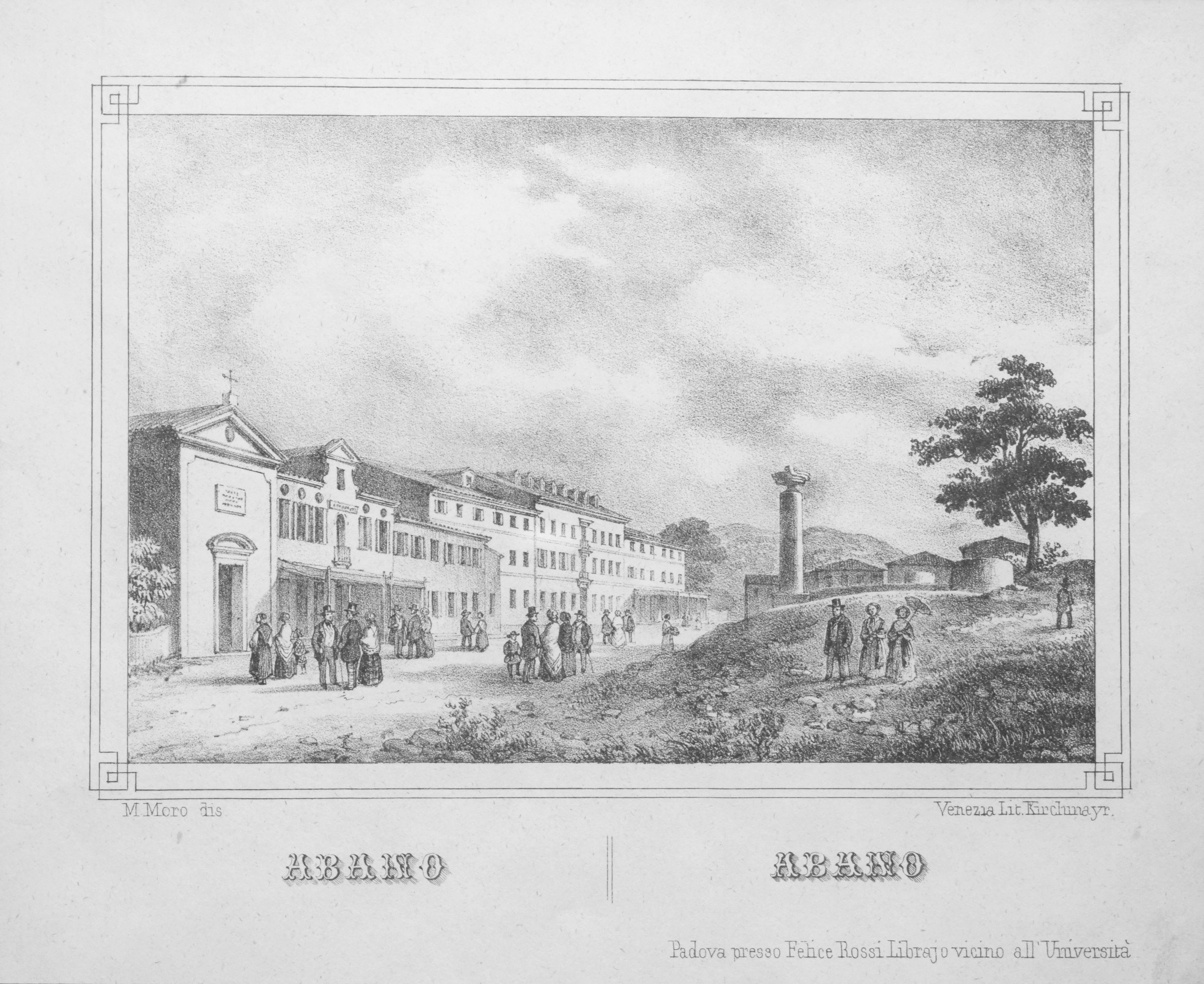
View of Montirone garden and Oratorio in Abano Terme, by Marco Moro, lithographer Cherubino Kirchmayr from Venice

Cherubino Kirchmayr (1848–1903) was an Italian lithographer and painter.

== Biography ==
He was born in Venice, then part of the Austrian Empire, and studied in the Accademia di Belle Arti of that city, where for two years he was also adjunct professor of elements of figure painting. He mainly dedicated himself to genre painting and portraits, and among his works are Ragazzaglia and Chioggiotti. Among his portraits are those of the Albrizzi family, the Countess Anima Morosini, the Hoyos family, Don Carlos, pretender to the Spanish throne and Princess Olga of Montenegro.
