= Casier =

- Comune
- Comune di Casier
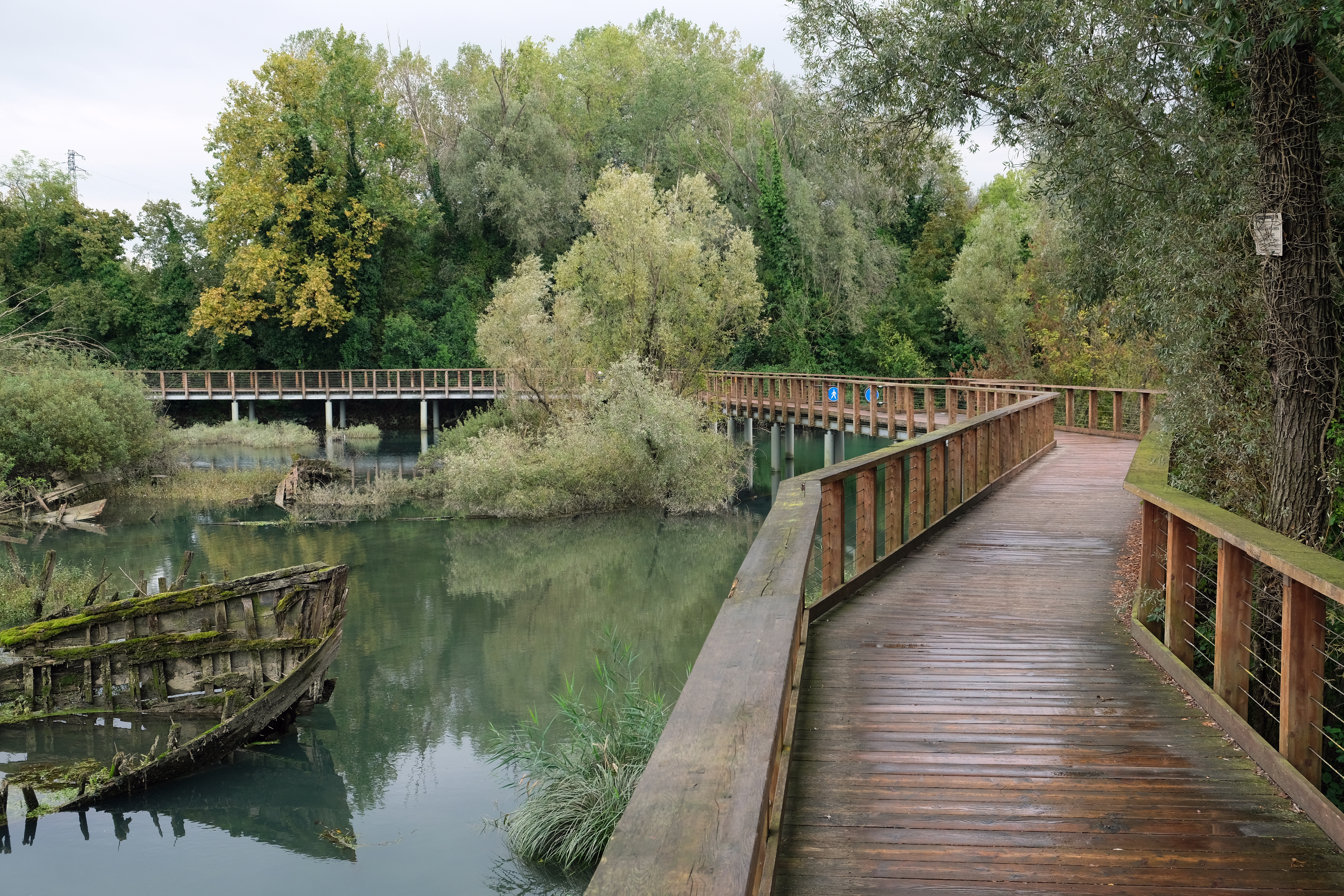
- Sile River near Casier

- Coat of arms

- Location within Italy Location within Veneto
- Coordinates: 45°39′N 12°18′E
- Country: Italy
- Region: Veneto
- Province: Treviso (TV)

Government
  - Mayor: Renzo Carraretto

Area
  - Total: 13.46 km^{2} (5.20 sq mi)
- Elevation: 5 m (16 ft)

Population (31 December 2019)
  - Total: 11,409
  - Density: 847.6/km^{2} (2,195/sq mi)
- Demonym: Casieresi
- Time zone: UTC+1 (CET)
  - Summer (DST): UTC+2 (CEST)
- Postal code: 31030
- Dialing code: 0422
- Patron saint: Saint Teonist
- Saint day: October 30 and June 26
- Website: Official website

Casier is a town and comune in the province of Treviso, Veneto region, in north-eastern Italy. The commune has its seat in Dosson di Casier, and includes the localities of Frescada (partially), Le Grazie (partially), La Sicilia, Camate.

== Culture ==
The Festa dello sloboz rosso di Frescada is held every year, between January and February .

== Town twinning ==
- Eaunes, France, since 2002
- Slobozia, Romania, since 1315

== Sources ==
- A. Dotto, G. B. Tozzato, Casier e Dosson nella storia, Grafiche Zoppelli, Dosson 1988.
- Giovanni Battista Tozzato, Pescatori e barcaroli sul Sile nel '300, Castello d'Amore, Treviso 1998.
- Giovanni Battista Tozzato, I Da Casier (sec. XII-XIV), Castello d'Amore, Treviso 2002.
