= Silea =

- Comune
- Comune di Silea
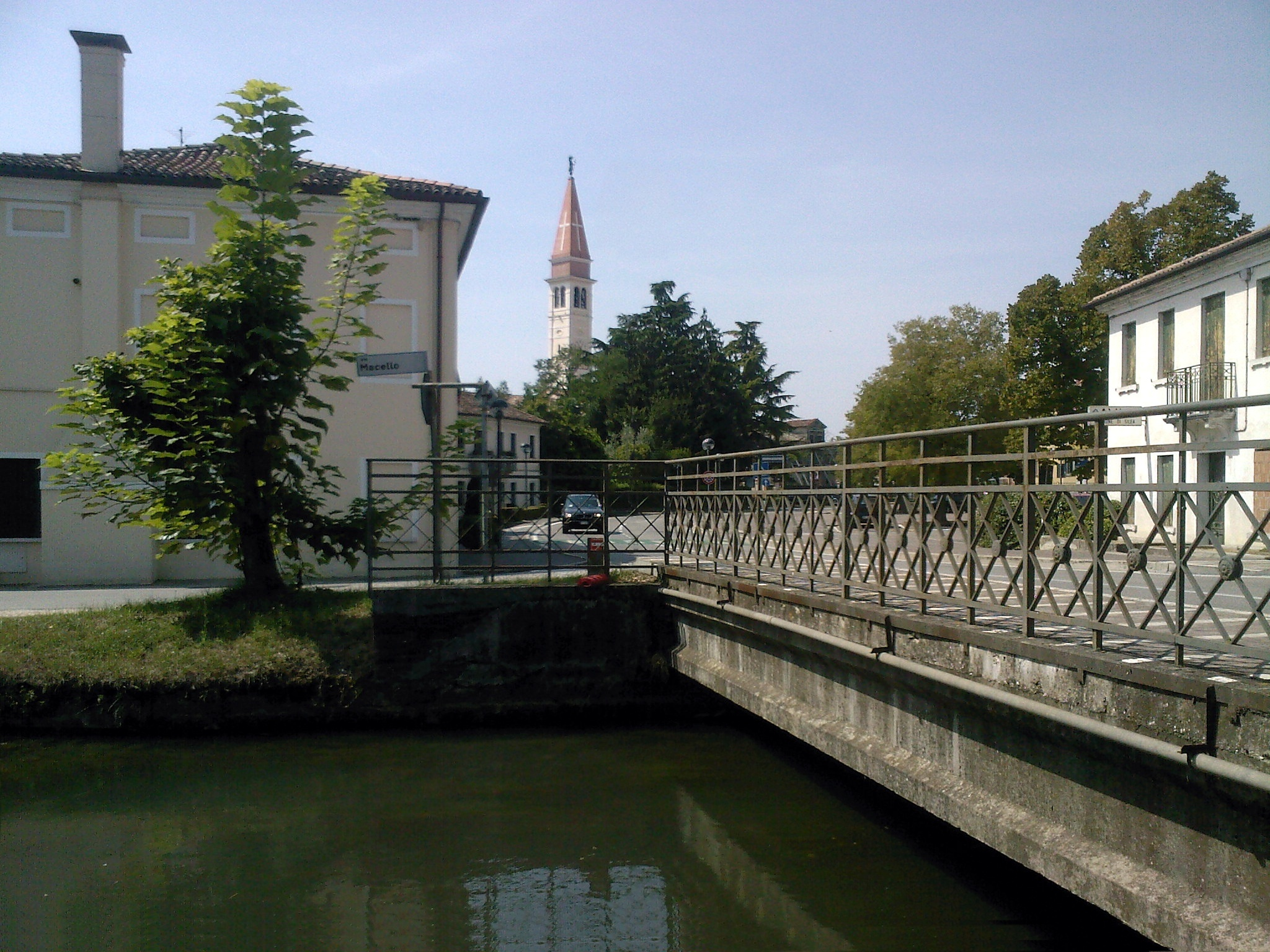

- Location within Italy Location within Veneto
- Coordinates: 45°39′12″N 12°17′45″E
- Country: Italy
- Region: Veneto
- Province: Province of Treviso (TV)

Area
  - Total: 18.7 km^{2} (7.2 sq mi)

Population (Dec. 2004)
  - Total: 9,767
  - Density: 522/km^{2} (1,350/sq mi)
- Time zone: UTC+1 (CET)
  - Summer (DST): UTC+2 (CEST)
- Postal code: 31057
- Dialing code: 0422
- Website: Official website

Silea is a comune (municipality) in the Province of Treviso in the Italian region Veneto, located about 25 kilometres (16 mi) north of Venice and about 4 kilometres (2 mi) east of Treviso. As of 31 December 2004, it had a population of 9,767 and an area of 18.7 square kilometres (7.2 mi^{2}).

Silea borders the following municipalities: Carbonera, Casale sul Sile, Casier, Roncade, San Biagio di Callalta, Treviso.
