= Roncade =

Comune in Veneto, Italy

- Comune
- Città di Roncade
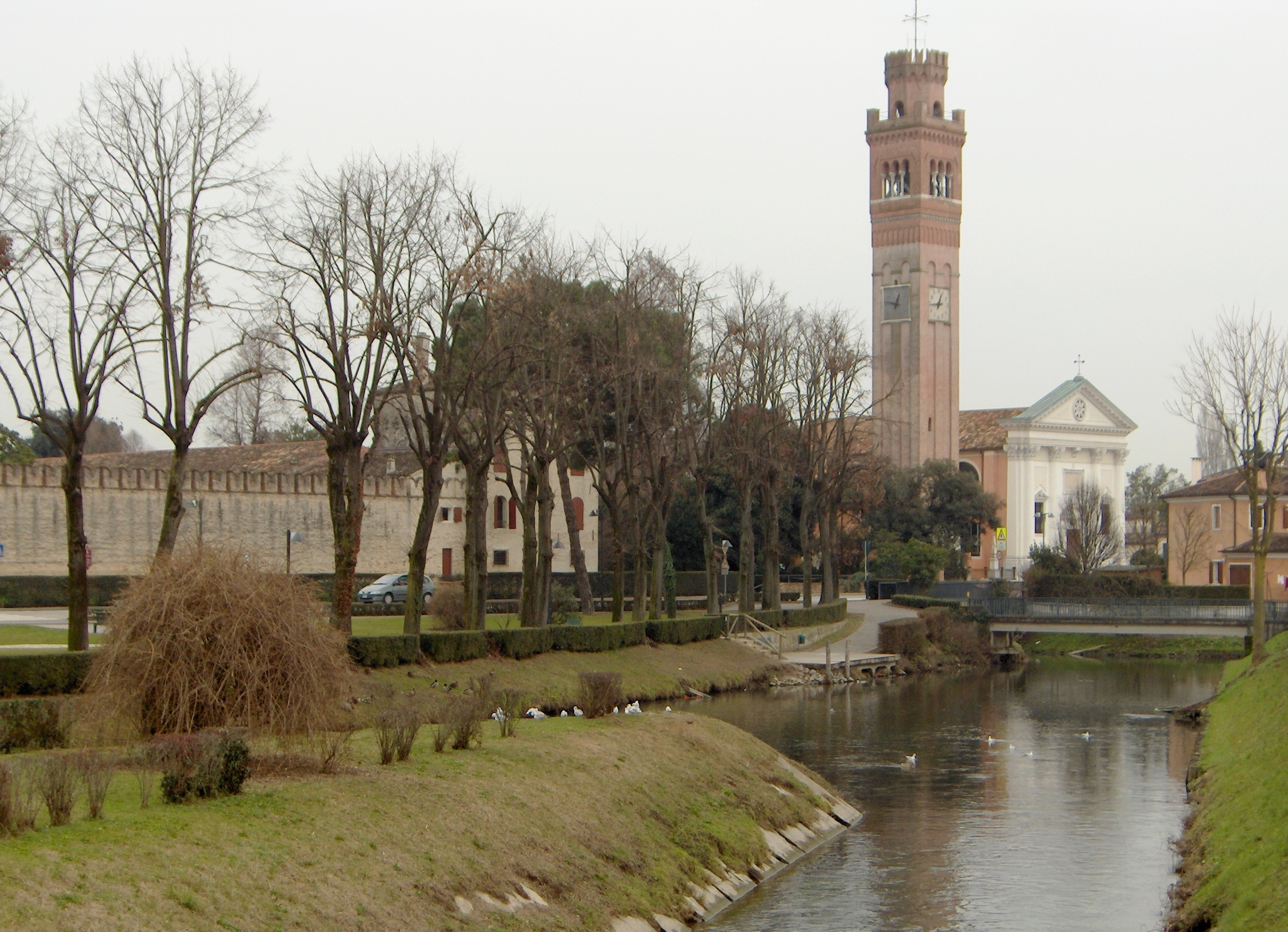

- Location within Italy Location within Veneto
- Coordinates: 45°38′N 12°22′E
- Country: Italy
- Region: Veneto
- Province: Province of Treviso (TV)
- Frazioni: Biancade, Musestre, San Cipriano, Ca'Tron, Vallio

Government
  - Mayor: Marco Donadel

Area
  - Total: 61.78 km^{2} (23.85 sq mi)
- Elevation: 8 m (26 ft)

Population (30 June 2023)
  - Total: 14,592
  - Density: 236.2/km^{2} (611.7/sq mi)
- Demonym: Roncadesi
- Time zone: UTC+1 (CET)
  - Summer (DST): UTC+2 (CEST)
- Postal code: 31056
- Dialing code: 0422
- Website: Official website

Roncade is a comune (municipality) in the Province of Treviso in the Italian region Veneto, located about 25 kilometres (16 mi) north of Venice and about 10 kilometres (6 mi) southeast of Treviso.

Roncade borders the following municipalities: Casale sul Sile, Meolo, Monastier di Treviso, Quarto d'Altino, San Biagio di Callalta, Silea.
