= Palazzo da Mula =

Building in Murano (Venice)

Coordinates: 45.4559°N 12.3517°E

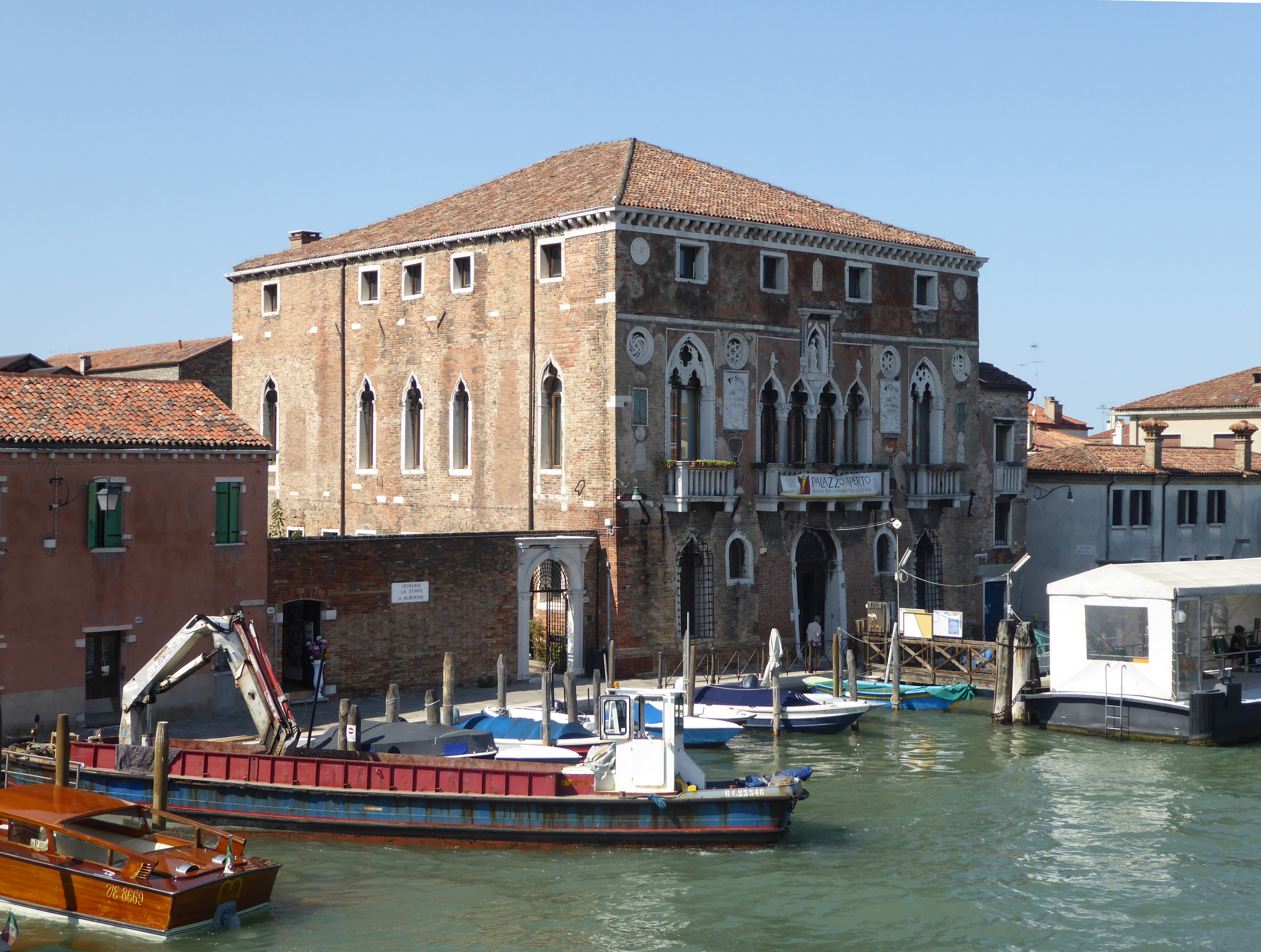

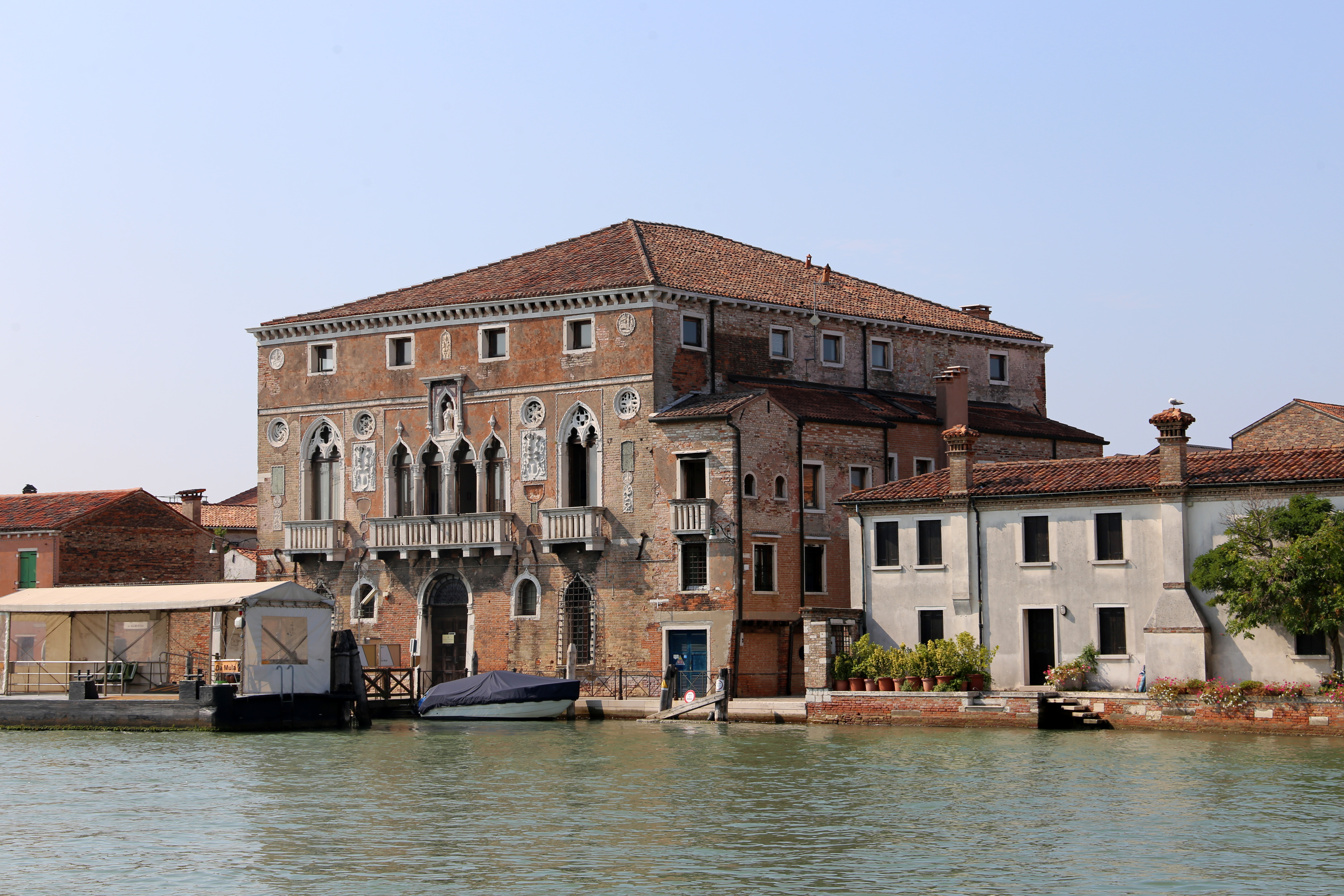
Palazzo da Mula

The Palazzo da Mula is a Venetian villa on the island of Murano in the Venice Lagoon, on the sub-island of San Pietro Martire, on the south bank of the Canale degli Angeli, near the Ponte Vivarini bridge that leads to the main island of Murano, San Donato. The palazzo is the last remnant of Venetian villas built in Murano in the 15th and 16th centuries. Originally there were only a few villas with extensive gardens on the island, but today the Palazzo da Mula is integrated into a row of houses. The 16th and 17th-century structure and details of the palazzo can be traced back to the Da Mula family, who had acquired the palazzo from the aristocratic Diedo family in 1621. The Da Mulas resided in this palazzo until 1712, when it was rented to the aristocratic family of Giacomo Fontanella, a member of the new aristocracy of glass masters, for a sum of 110 ducats. The property then passed to Giacomo's son, Zuanne Fontanella.

The building is now a branch of the Municipality of Venice-Murano-Burano and houses the registry offices. The main floor is used for cultural activities.

The exterior features Venetian Gothic motifs, fronting on Murano's main canal. The interior detailing has not survived. The palace shows the late Gothic building forms typical of Venetian architecture. It is built of reddish bricks, has a tiled roof and decorative elements are made of white Istrian marble. Unlike many Venetian palaces, the portal on the water side does not lead directly into the canal, but onto the narrow street that accompanies the canal.

The Murano palazzo should not be confused with the Palazzo da Mula Morosini, which is on the Grand Canal and was painted by Claude Monet during his trip to Venice in 1908.

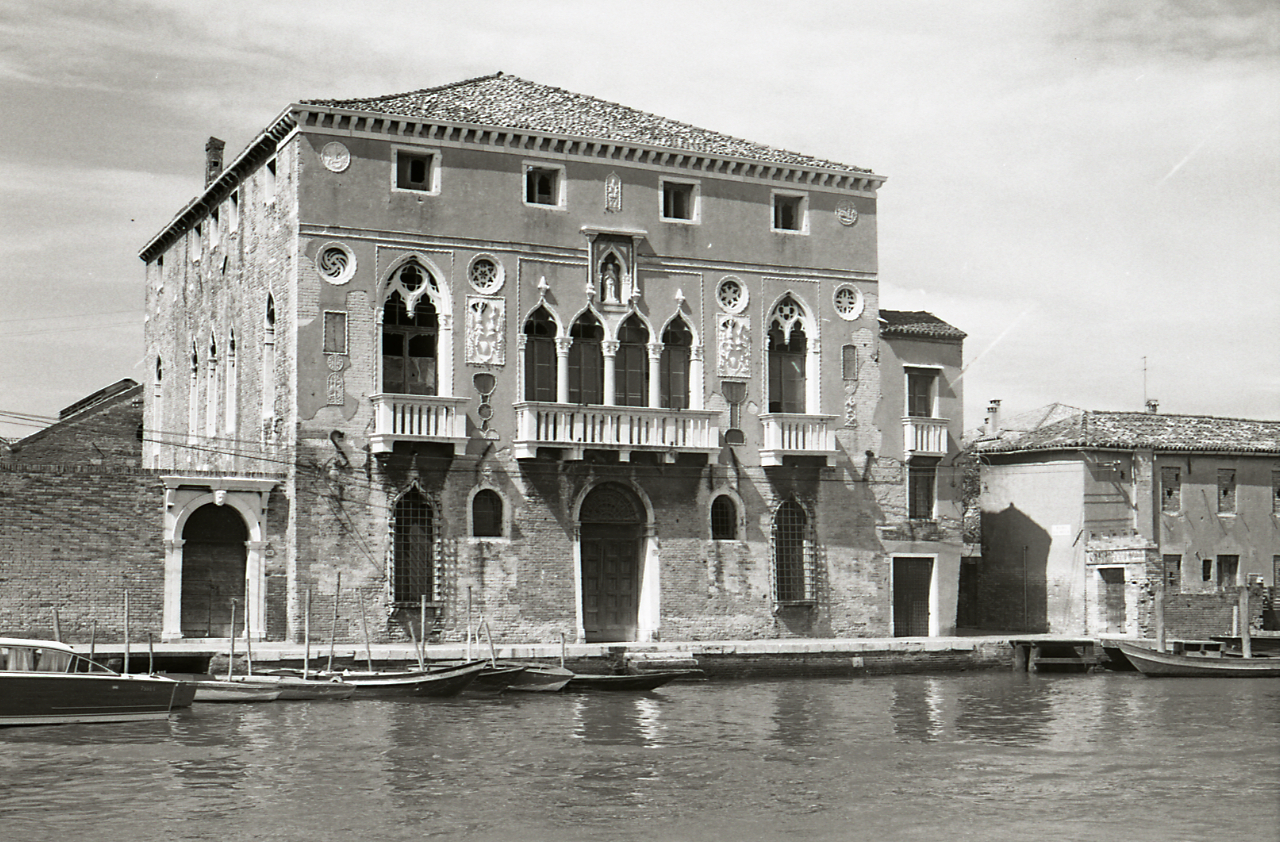
Photo by Paolo Monti, 1969

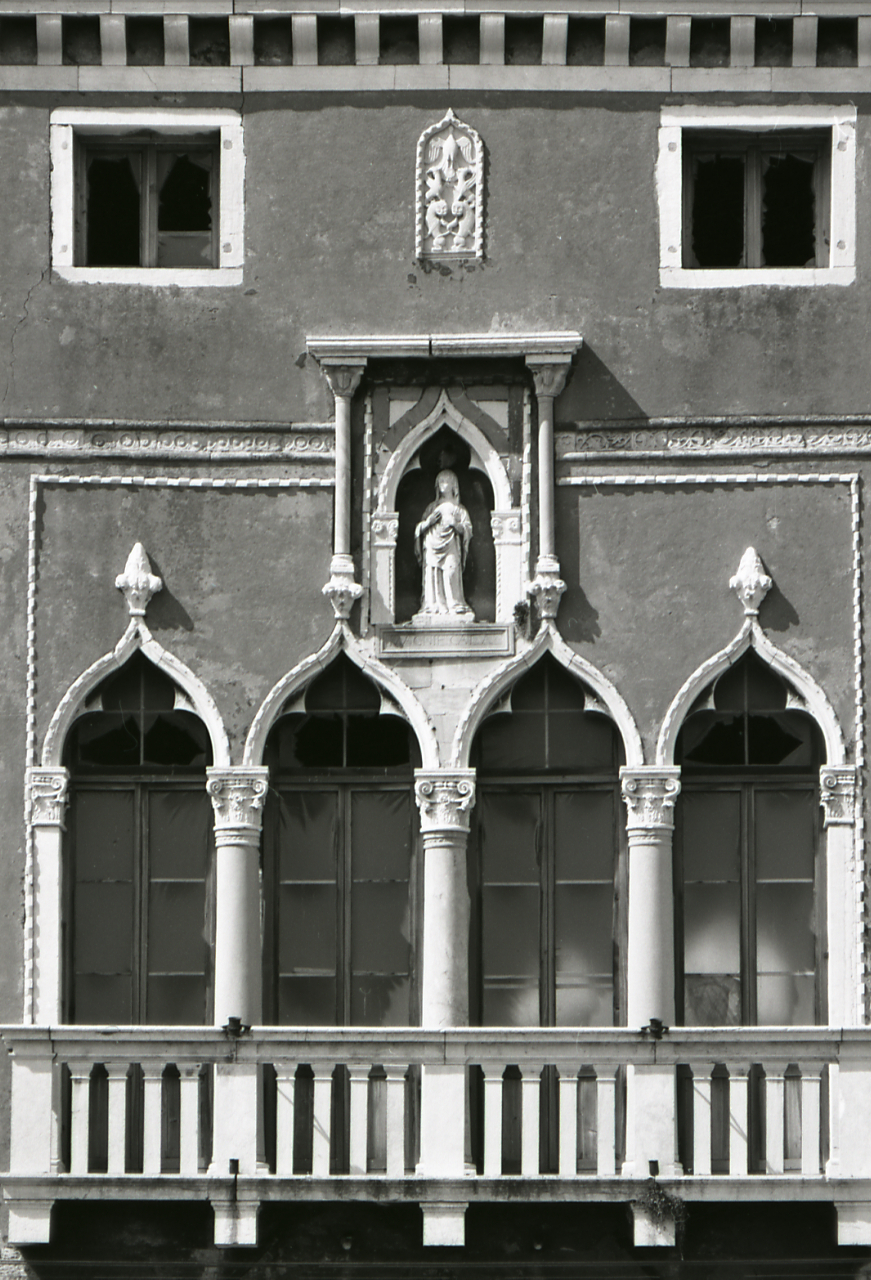
Detail. Photo by Paolo Monti, 1969

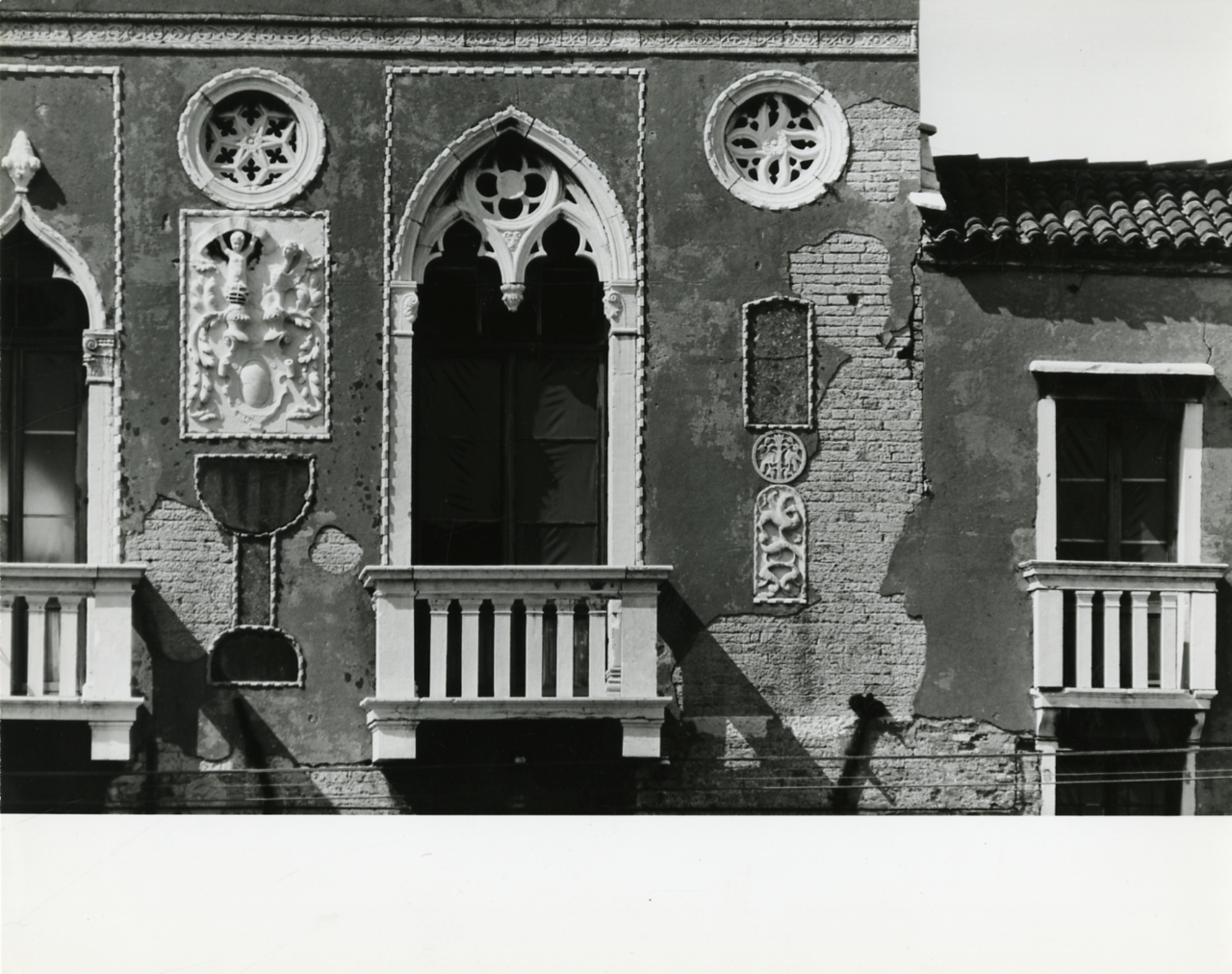
Detail. Photo by Paolo Monti, 1969

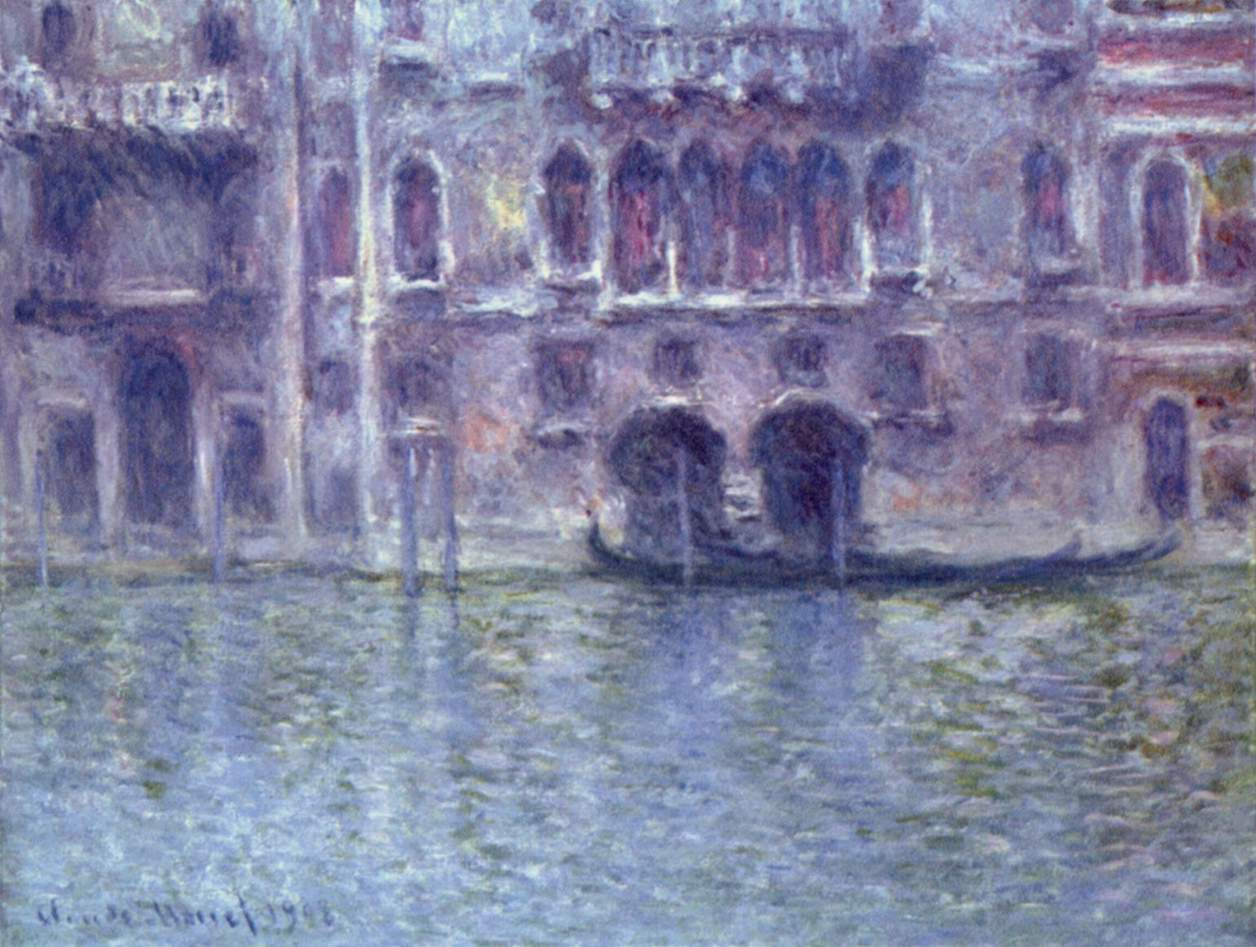
The Palazzo da Mula Morosini on the Grand Canal, pictured above, was the subject of a 1908 painting by Claude Monet held in the collection of the National Gallery of Art, Washington, D.C. The Morosini palazzo and the Palazzo da Mula share some architectural similarities.
