= Vascon =

- Frazione
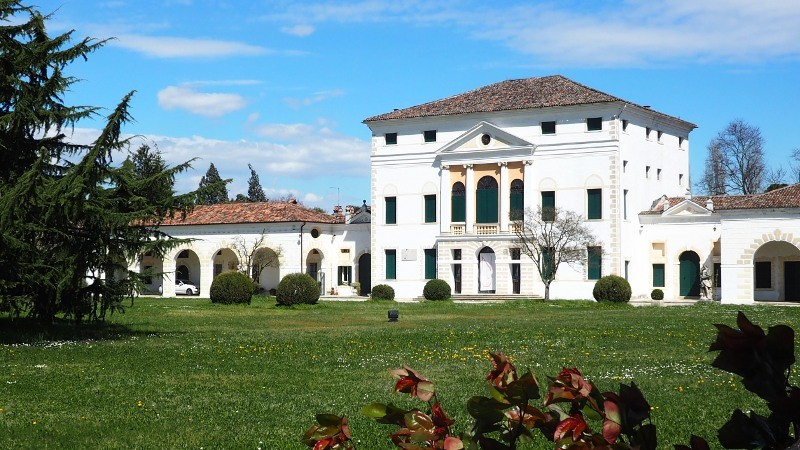
- Villa Loredan Valier Perocco di Meduna
- Country: Italy
- Region: Veneto
- Province: Treviso
- Comune: Carbonera

Population (2026)
  - Total: 1,598
- Postal code: 31050

Vascon is a frazione of the comune of Carbonera, in the Province of Treviso, Veneto, northern Italy. It is one of the inhabited centres recognised by the municipal statute of Carbonera, together with Carbonera, Mignagola, Pezzan and San Giacomo di Musestrelle. A 2026 municipal resolution listed Vascon with 1,598 inhabitants.

The settlement lies in the northern part of the municipal territory of Carbonera, in the Treviso plain north-east of Treviso. Its landscape is historically agricultural and today includes residential areas, local roads and scattered rural buildings. Vascon is also associated with the system of Venetian villas in the Carbonera area.

== Geography ==
Vascon is located in the north-eastern sector of Carbonera, along local routes connecting Carbonera and Pezzan with Lovadina and the plain toward the Piave. The settlement is served by local and provincial roads, including the provincial road known as the road of Vascon.

The area is part of the flat countryside of the Marca Trevigiana, with farmland, dispersed dwellings and residential development around the historic centre. Near Villa Loredan Valier Perocco di Meduna, sources connected with the Mignagola stream are also recorded.

== History ==
Local historical tradition gives 1005 as one of the earliest references to Vascon. The village church is documented in the 12th century: according to the parish reconstruction, in 1152 it depended on Lancenigo and in 1189 it became autonomous. In 1330 the parish church was dedicated to Saint Lucy.

In the Middle Ages Vascon formed part of the rural territory of Treviso. Local sources connect the village with the Zosagna di Sopra, a historical district of the Treviso area, and with devotional confraternities, frescoes and heraldic remains connected with the religious life of the community.

== Landmarks ==
=== Church of Saint Lucy ===
The parish church of Vascon is dedicated to Saint Lucy the Virgin and Martyr and stands in Via A. Diaz. The catalogue of the Italian Episcopal Conference identifies it as the parish church of Vascon, in the Diocese of Treviso.

The church is one of the main historic and religious landmarks of the settlement. Parish sources record medieval remains, frescoes and other evidence that emerged during surveys and restoration work.

=== Venetian villas ===
Vascon contains several historic residences and rural complexes connected with the civilisation of the Venetian villa. Provincial planning documents list, among others, Villa Bragadin Ruberti, Villa Callegari, Villa Gitta Caccianiga, Villa Monti, Villa Tiepolo Passi, Villa Trevisan Boldu Monterumici and Villa Valier Loredan Stocco Perocco.

==== Villa Loredan Valier Perocco di Meduna ====
Among the most notable complexes in Vascon is Villa Loredan Valier Perocco di Meduna, also known as Villa Valier Loredan Perocco di Meduna or Villa Loredan at Carbonera. The villa stands in Via Valier and is an aristocratic residence of late 17th- and early 18th-century origin, set within a garden, park and walled brolo.

The complex is linked to the Venetian patrician Trevisan and Loredan families. In 1644 Marietta Trevisan brought properties at Vascon as dowry to the Loredan family. Between the late 17th century and the early 18th century the villa acquired its monumental layout, with a central main block and two symmetrical porticoed barchesse. The complex was enriched around 1720 by Antonio and Alvise Loredan.

The facade has a regular composition with lateral barchesse and a central block marked by classical elements. Inside, the upper hall is double-height, with balconies and fresco decoration. The fresco cycle, dated to around 1720, is attributed to Girolamo Brusaferro and to perspective painters probably from Emilia; the scenes are set within illusionistic architecture and depict episodes from ancient Roman history.

Near the villa stands the oratory of the Madonna of Loreto, consecrated in 1719, with a circular plan and a triple-apsed presbytery. The park preserves six allegorical statues attributed to Alvise Tagliapietra, while the walled brolo and the waters connected with the Mignagola contribute to the landscape value of the complex.

== Local life ==
Vascon is mainly residential and agricultural, integrated into the network of inhabited centres of Carbonera. Local life is connected with the parish, associations and municipal services distributed among the frazioni of the comune.

In the 20th century the Colonia Agricola of Vascon also became significant. Established in the former Villa Callegari complex, from 1927 it was used for the care and education of children of farmers who had died in the First World War.

== Gallery ==
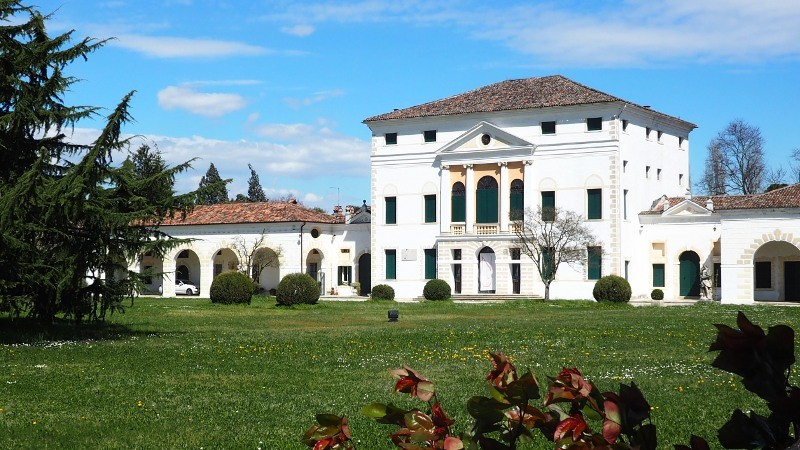
Villa Loredan Valier Perocco di Meduna

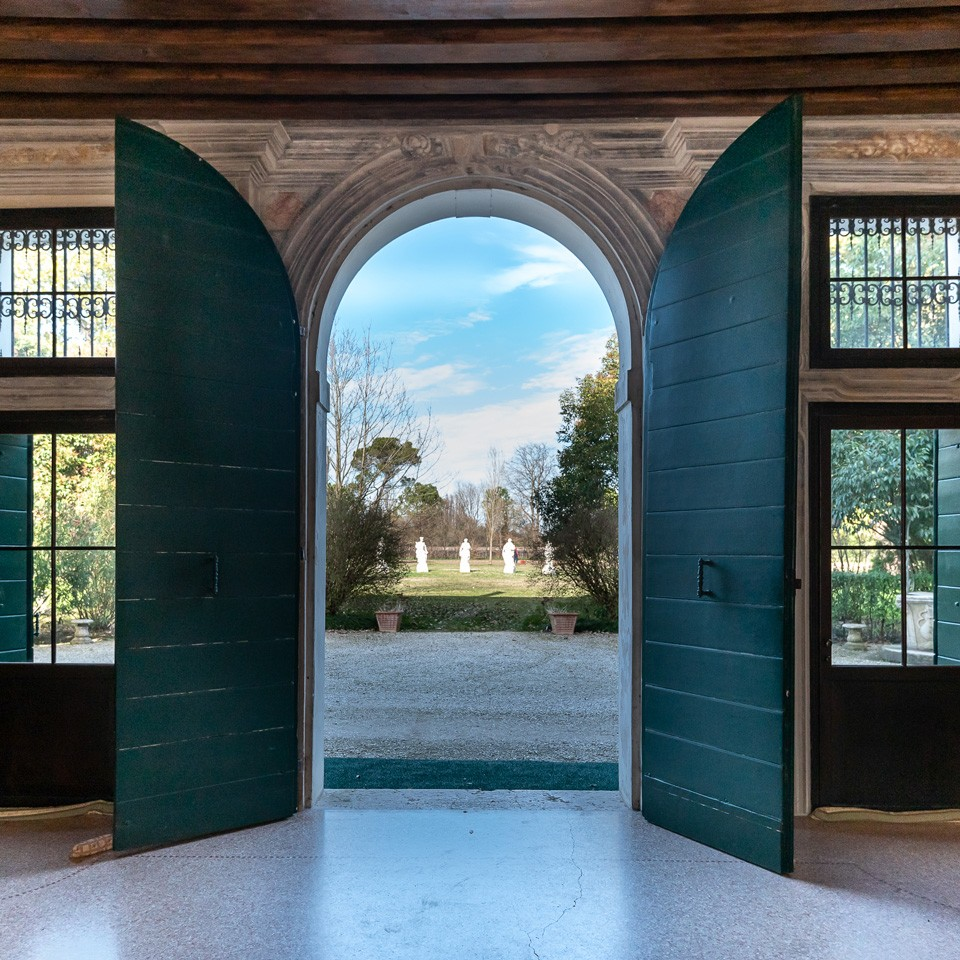
Entrance of Villa Loredan

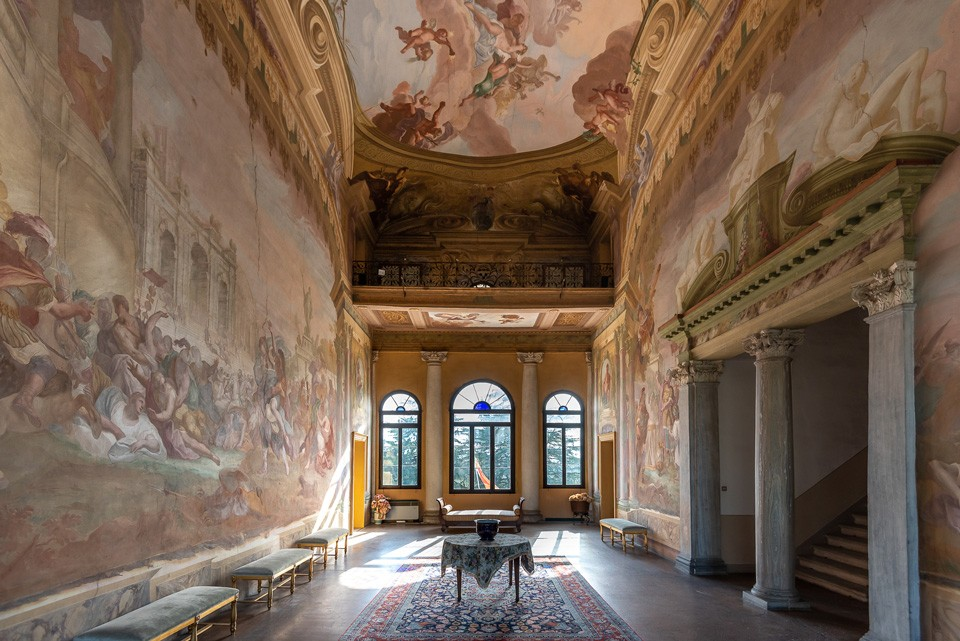
Frescoed interior of Villa Loredan

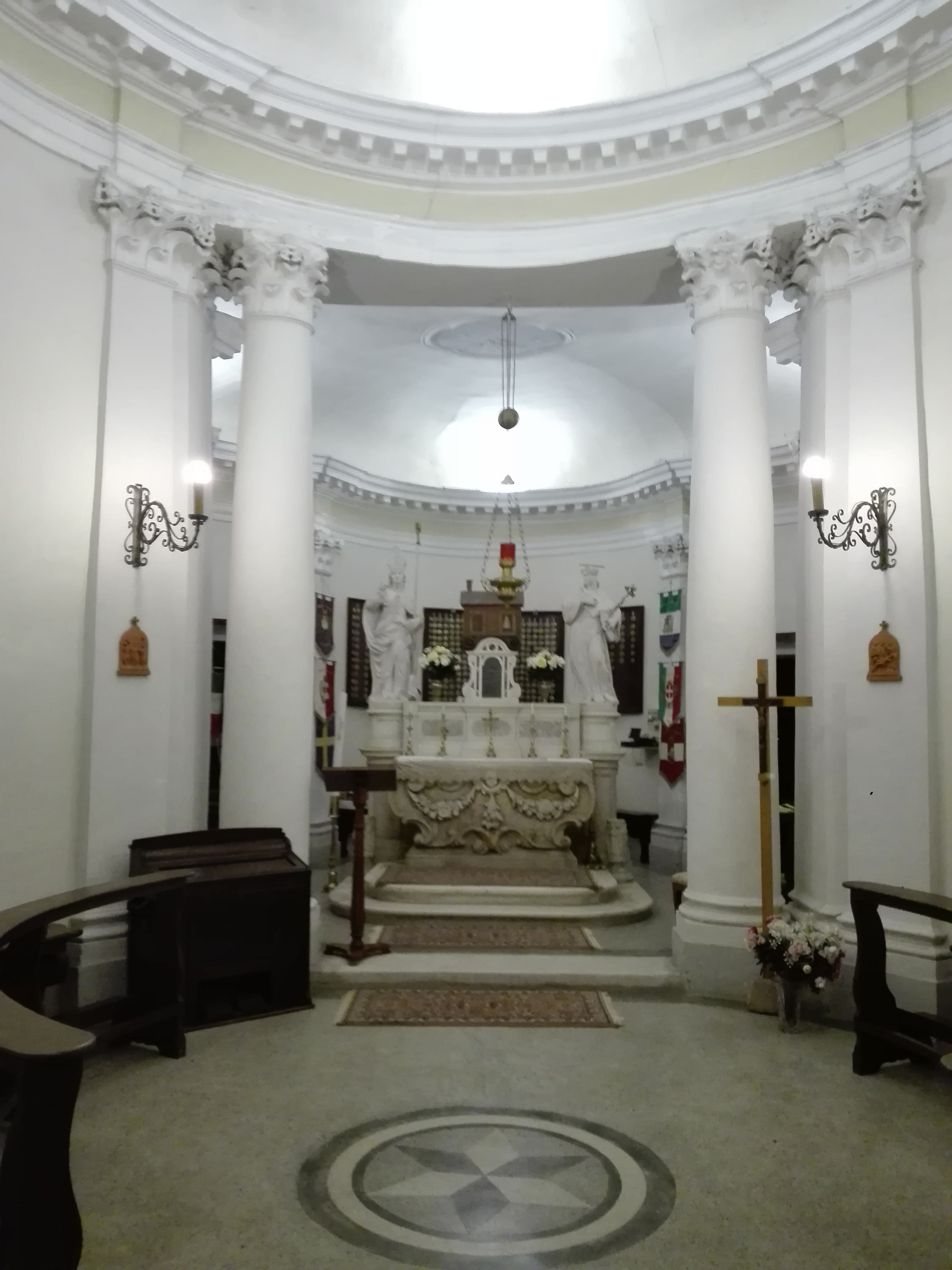
Oratory of the Madonna of Loreto

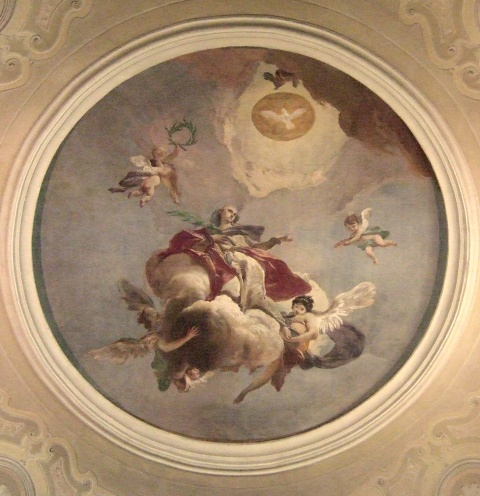
Glory of Saint Lucy in the parish church of Vascon

== See also ==
- Carbonera
- Villa Loredan Valier Perocco di Meduna
- Villa veneta
