= Villa Loredan Valier Perocco di Meduna =

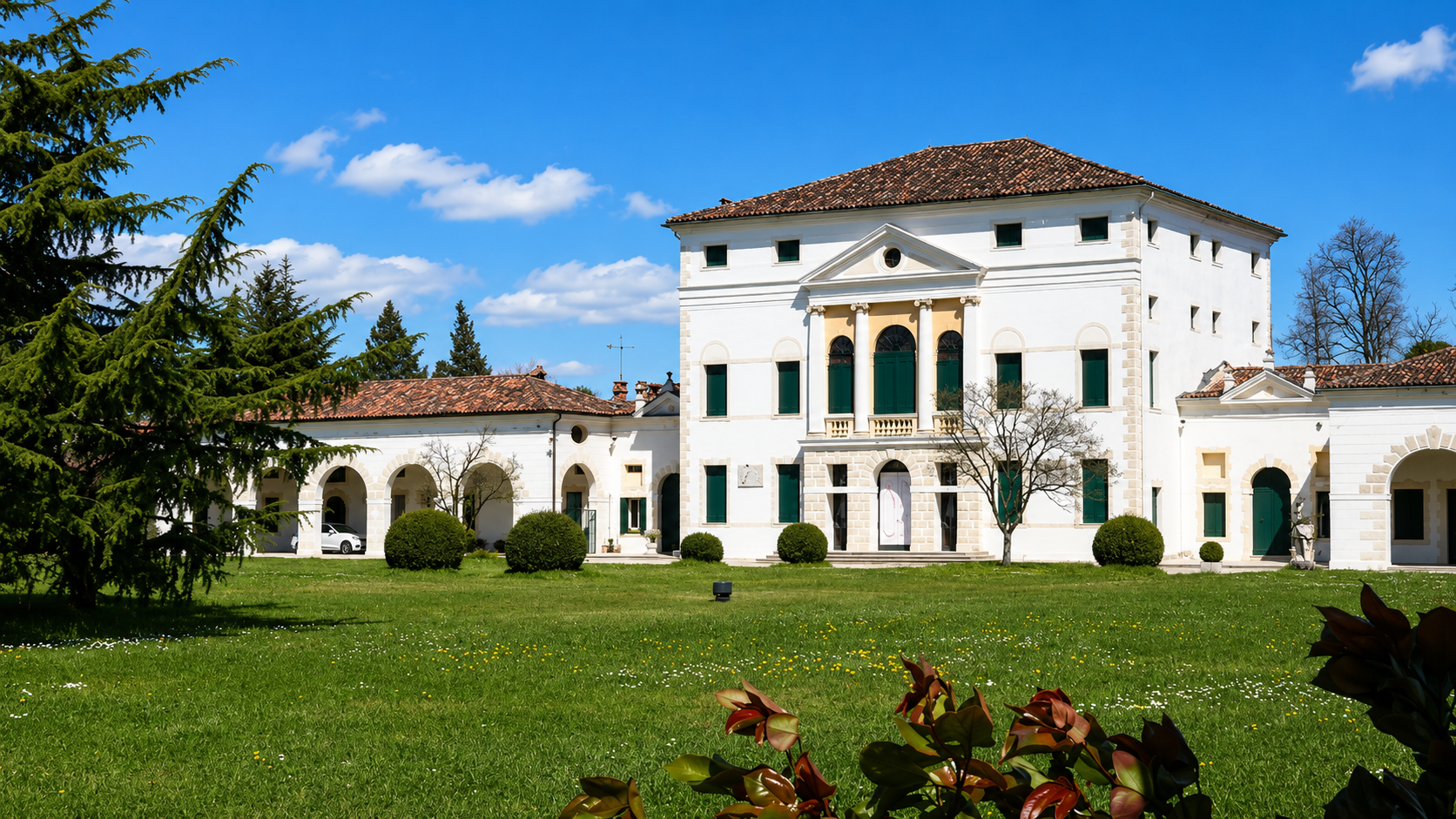
- South front of Villa Loredan Valier Perocco di Meduna
- Alternative names: Villa Loredan at Carbonera; Villa Loredan Valier Perocco
- Etymology: by the Loredan family

General information
- Location: Via Valier 28, Vascon, Carbonera, Italy
- Construction started: 1679 (after legal settlement of Trevisan estate)
- Completed: 1720 (frescoes); oratory consecrated 1719
- Owner: Perocco di Meduna family

Technical details
- Floor count: 3

Design and construction
- Architect: Possibly Andrea Tirali (attribution proposed on stylistic grounds)
- Developer: Zuanne Loredan (late 17th-c. core); Antonio Loredan and Alvise Loredan (early 18th-c. monumental redesign)

The Villa Loredan Valier Perocco di Meduna, also known as Villa Loredan at Carbonera or Villa Loredan Valier Perocco, is a late 17th- and early 18th-century aristocratic villa located in Vascon, a district of Carbonera in the northern Italian region of Veneto. Set discreetly within a still-intact walled enclosure of Trevisan countryside, the villa is distinguished by its symmetrical three-body composition, with a cubic manor house flanked by two lower porticoed barchesse, and by the spectacular double-height frescoed hall on its piano nobile, recognized today as one of the most striking examples of Baroque illusionistic decoration in the Veneto.

== Setting and territory ==
The villa stands isolated in a small, intact quadrant of luxuriant Trevisan countryside, set several hundred metres east of the ancient road that runs from Treviso–Sant'Artemio through Lancenigo to Maserada, where it meets the Roman Via Postumia near the historic fords of the Piave river. The site also lies close to the north–south Via Claudia Augusta Altinate, which connected Altino to the prealpine passes of the Bellunese, and to the Ungaresca variant running from Treviso through Lancenigo and Vascon toward Lovadina.

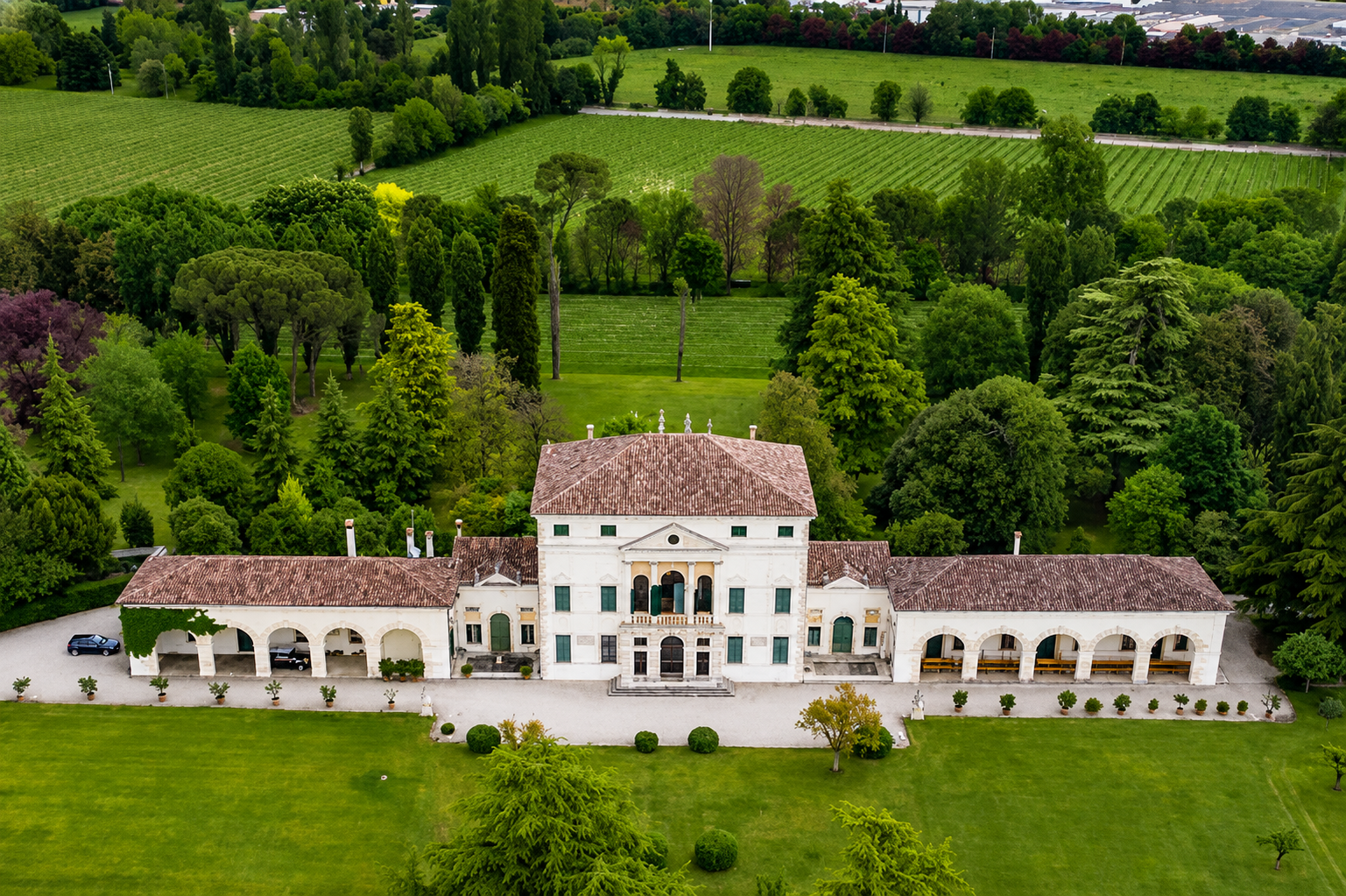
Aerial view of the villa, its barchesse and the walled park.

The Carta Archeologica del Veneto records that a road bed of the Roman centuriation of Tarvisium crosses the great walled quadrangle of the villa's brolo just north of the manor house, perpendicular to its south-west/north-east axis, an orientation the villa itself preserves. A Roman "sawn-amphora tomb" and traces of the Via Claudia Augusta have been reported in the immediate vicinity. The site's terrain alternates gravelly Piave alluvial fans with clay strata; the contact between these layers feeds several risorgive springs, one of which, a source of the Mignagola stream, rises inside the walled brolo itself.

== History ==
=== Before the villa: the Trevisan family (15th–17th centuries) ===
Substantial landholdings at Vascon were held from at least the mid-15th century by the Venetian patrician Trevisan family of the "Santa Maria Formosa" branch, part of the wider pattern of Venetian terraferma investment that followed the consolidation of Venetian rule over the Marca Trevigiana in 1389 and the Padovano in 1405. By the 16th century a unitary Vascon estate was held by Francesco Trevisan q. Zuanne (b. c. 1510), who in 1535 married Elisabetta Zen and had three sons: Zuanne (1538–1606), Marco (1541–1616) and Ludovico (Alvise, 1548–1592). Two parallel inheritance lines descended from the elder two sons.

Through the senior line, Zuanne's grandson Daniele Trevisan (b. 1582), who married Elisabetta Giustinian in 1624, had a single daughter and heiress, Marietta. In 1644 Marietta married Zuanne Loredan (1610–1699) q. Domenico, of the branch later known as "di San Vio", bringing the Vascon estate as part of her dowry. This is the documented "Trevisan root" of the Vascon property that became the Loredan villa.

Through the cadet line, Marco Trevisan's granddaughter Bianca (d. 1677), heiress of Francesco Trevisan q. Marco (1578–1647) and Elisabetta Valier, married Scipione Boldù in 1647, transferring the second portion of the Vascon estate to the Boldù family. Both passages occurred almost simultaneously, in the mid-1640s, and are first recorded as new patrician names in the parish at Bishop Gian Antonio Lupi's pastoral visit of 6 June 1648.

Because the originally unitary Trevisan estate had accumulated layers of dotal, usufructuary and livello rights, a Venetian magistrature act (Procurator-Giudici, 20 June 1679) was required to ratify the effective rights of all interested parties. Only after this date, when he was 69, was Zuanne Loredan free to dispose of his Vascon property without encumbrance, and free to undertake substantial building work on the manor house.

=== The 17th-century villa: first nucleus under Zuanne Loredan ===
The Loredan are first implicitly attested at Vascon in 1648, when Bishop Lupi listed them, along with the Boldù, among the delinquent contributors to the parish luminaria, indicating that the young couple Zuanne and Marietta Loredan had already begun seasonal residence in Vascon, then presumably using the older Trevisan manor. A worn Venetian-Gothic well-head of late 14th-century type, surviving behind the manor with an abraded coat of arms, hints at the antiquity and nobility of the prior settlement.

Several architectural and proportional clues suggest that the present manor was built, more accurately re-built, by Zuanne Loredan in the years immediately after the 1679 settlement, on the foundations and partly on the masonry of an earlier 16th-century Trevisan house. The decision to preserve the orientation of the older structure is significant: the manor's axis, with façade facing south-west, follows the same alignment as the great walled rectangle of the brolo, which itself conforms to the Roman centuriation grid.

The resulting building is a tall parallelepiped containing a raised ground floor, a piano nobile and a lowered attic storey, under a four-pitched hipped roof. Its plan follows the canonical Veneto tripartite scheme: a central portego running through from front to back façade, two pairs of rooms on each side, and a two-flight staircase placed transversely between the western rooms. A schematic map of 1713 records this late 17th-century configuration, showing the great walled rectangle of the brolo with the cubic manor inside, a small service body attached to the rear (likely the predecessor of today's left barchessa), and the still-extant "gardener's house" sketched to the south-east.

=== Antonio Loredan and the public cursus honorum ===
The radical early 18th-century transformation of the villa was made possible by the social and institutional rise of Antonio Loredan (1666–1748), third son of Zuanne and Marietta. Antonio's exceptional public career in the service of the Serenissima included posts as Provveditore Straordinario in Armata (1698–1700), Provveditore Generale in Morea (1698–1708 and 1711–1714), Provveditore Straordinario at Peschiera (1703–1710), Podestà of Brescia (1716), Provveditore Generale and Inquisitore alle Isole del Levante (1716–1719), Provveditore Generale in Armata (1718), Inquisitore in Terraferma (1723–1725), Provveditore Straordinario in Terraferma "di là del Mincio" (1733–1736), Provveditore Generale da Mar (1739–1744), and finally Capitano Generale da Mar in 1746, at the age of 82.

He played a decisive role, alongside Marshal Schulenburg and Capitano Generale da Mar Andrea Pisani, in the successful Venetian defence of Corfu against the Ottoman siege of July–August 1716. For this service the Venetian Senate created him Knight of Saint Mark on 12 September 1716. Shortly afterward, in November of the same year, the sacred-military oratorio Juditha Triumphans, celebrating the Venetian victory over the Turks, was performed at the Ospedale della Pietà; the work was composed by Antonio Vivaldi very probably on the commission of Antonio Loredan himself, a noted music patron.

=== The 1717–1720 transformation ===
From around 1717, on the strength of these successes and jointly with his elder brother Alvise (b. 1663), with whom he co-owned the family property and, in 1718, the Venetian palace at San Vio (the present Palazzo Cini), Antonio undertook the comprehensive prestige redesign of the Vascon villa. The agricultural function was decentralized to tenant farms across the wider estate, and the villa was reconceived as a residence of representational svago e villeggiatura in the manner of the most ambitious 18th-century country houses of the Brenta Riviera, Terraglio, the Lombard Navigli and the Genoese ville. The architect of the campaign is undocumented; some stylistic features suggest a possible attribution to Andrea Tirali (1657–1737).

==== Architectural reconfiguration ====
The asymmetrical late 17th-century complex was reorganised into a strictly symmetrical front composition. To the central manor block two lower barchesse, each of five wide arches and entirely treated in differentiated bugnato, were aligned along a single façade plane: the left barchessa presumably reworked from the existing service wing, the right one built ex novo. Both are roofed in large hipped pavilions. The junction between each barchessa and the central block is mediated by a small body, slightly recessed from the main façade line, defining two small rectangular fore-courts into which the porticoes of the barchesse open laterally. These linking bodies contain vaulted ground-floor halls (the right-hand one preserves its original painted decoration, recently recovered) that serve as visual and physical passages between the front garden and the rear brolo.

==== The upper salone-auditorium and the open loggia ====
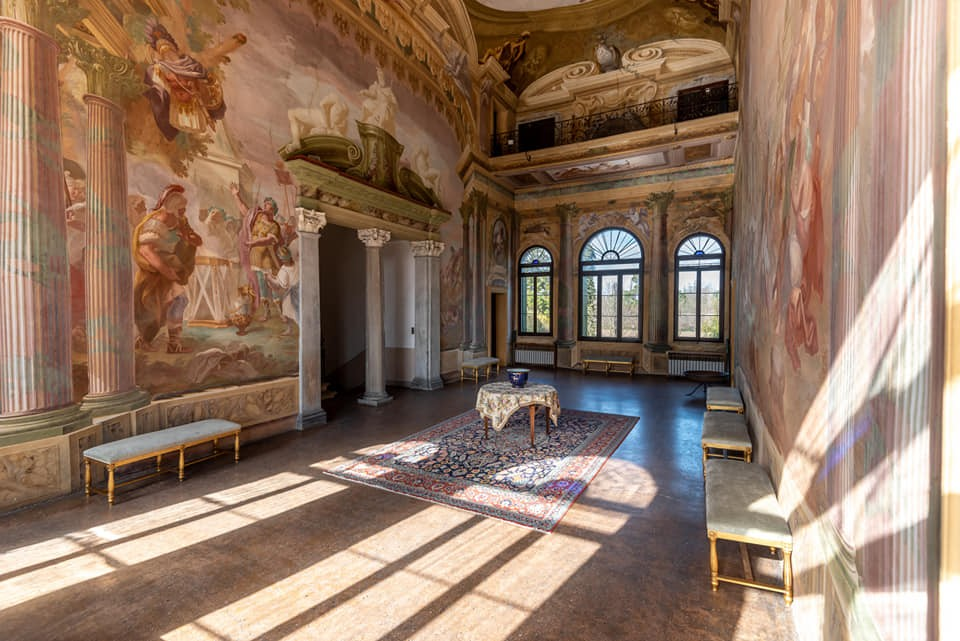
The upper salone links the frescoed interior to the Ionic loggia.

The most inventive intervention was reserved for the central portego of the piano nobile. The second floor immediately above it was sacrificed: by removing the intermediate ceiling, the volume of the salone was extended upward to a new high vaulted ceiling just below the roof timbers. At the level of the suppressed attic, two iron-balustraded balconies were inserted at the front and rear ends of the room, serving both as disobbligo for the lateral attic chambers (which received fine Venetian stucco decoration) and as musicians' tribunes. The redesign of the salone is thus inseparable from Antonio Loredan's role as a musical patron: it is, in effect, a private auditorium of carefully calculated acoustic shape.

The boldest move was made on the front-façade end of this salone. Where Veneto tradition would have placed a triple light with balustraded balcony, the architect instead opened the wall entirely into a four-columned loggia, with two great central Ionic columns and angular pilasters in masonry and marmorino, crowned externally by a classical triangular pediment of distinctly pre-neoclassical, "Palladian" character. This tetrastyle pronaos supplies the centre to the whole composition and creates an unprecedented interior–exterior continuity between garden and salone. The original full opening can still be read: the partial 19th-century infill (probably by the Valier family) with narrower arched windows leaves visible the full external/internal perimeter of the giant columns. The loggia was very likely kept fully open during the summer residential months.

==== Hypothetical external staircase ====
An oral tradition recalls a vanished external staircase rising from the front garden to the salone. A double-flight "pincer"-shaped Baroque staircase, set against the central façade and rising to the loggia, would be architecturally congruent, provided it left clear the central arch and lateral architraved openings serving the lower portego. The six allegorical statues now in the villa (see below), as well as their stylistic and narrative coherence, plausibly belonged to such a staircase, ascending in two groups of three toward the loggia and culminating in the celebration of Roman virtues inside the salone.

== Description ==
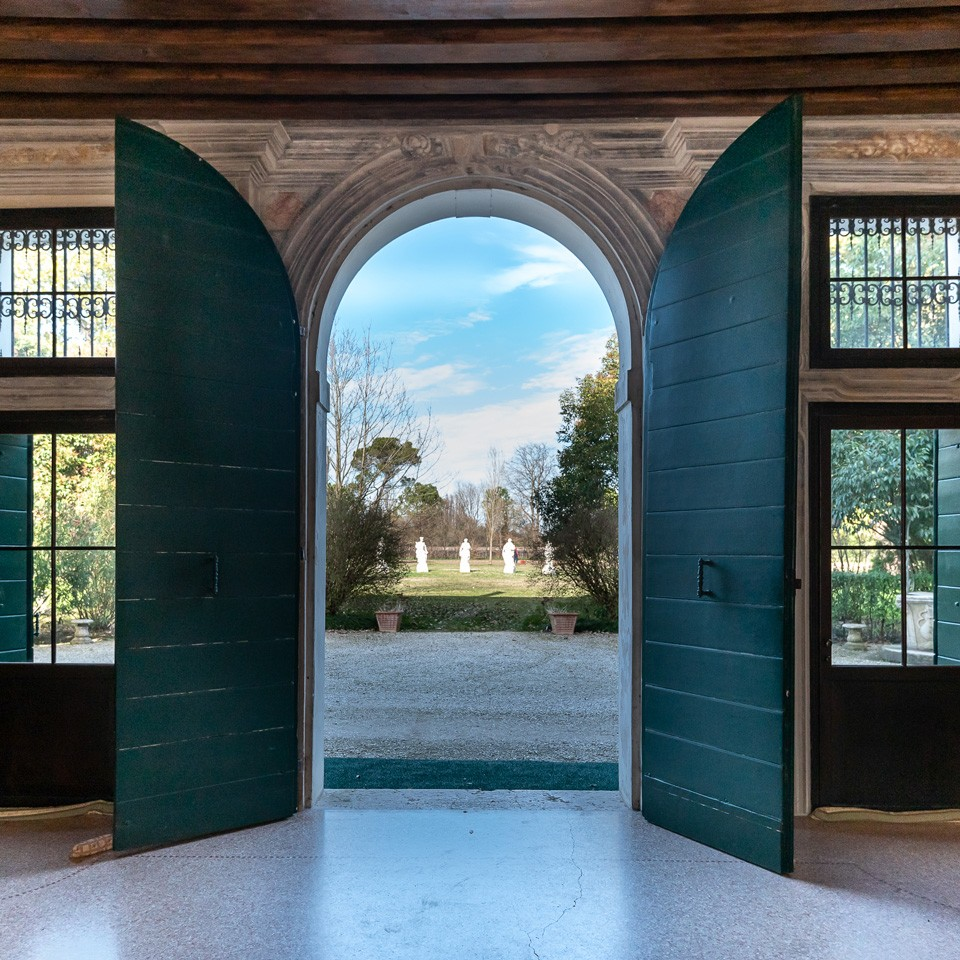
View from the ground-floor portego toward the park.

The villa consists of a monumental central block flanked horizontally by two porticoed barchesse, formerly intended to house servants, arranged in entirely symmetrical position. At its centre, the façade contains four Ionic semicolumns and a triangular tympanum; this neo-Palladian motif is an early 18th-century addition (c. 1717–1720), as are the linking sections between the main block and the two barchesse. The overall architectural effect, predominantly horizontal, fits well into the flat countryside of the March of Treviso.

=== Interior decoration ===
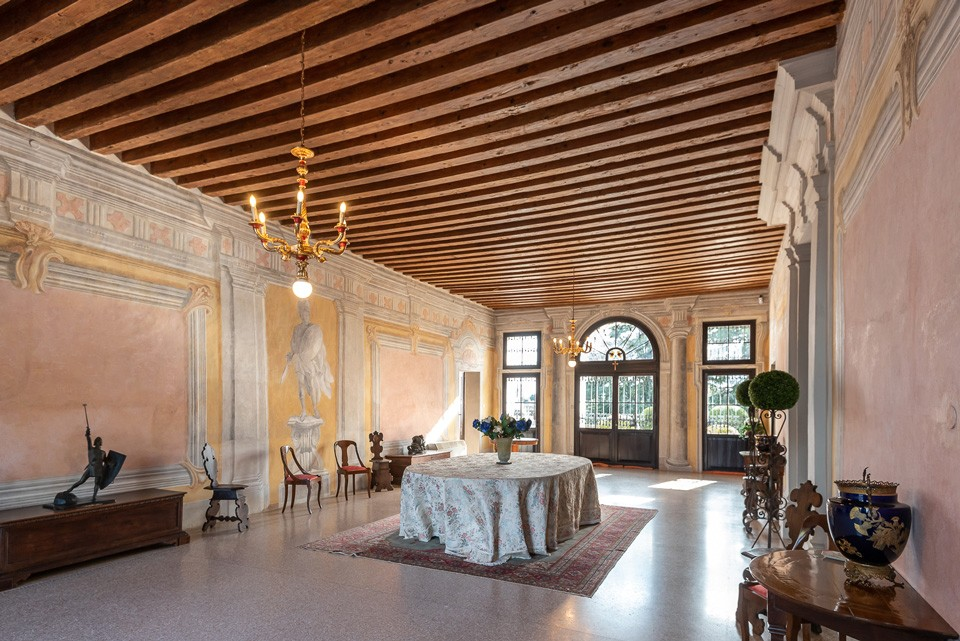
Ground-floor interior with frescoed architectural decoration.

Several rooms preserve fresco decoration from the 1717–1720 campaign; others almost certainly conceal further frescoes under 19th-century lime whitewash, since whitewashing was applied at that time to virtually every room except the upper salone. The ground-floor portego and the vaulted ground-floor hall in the right-hand linking body have both been recently recovered from beneath later whitewash and plaster layers (sequence: vault c. 2020; walls c. 2025; ground-floor portego frescoes brought back to light in the 2010s).

==== Ground-floor portego ====
An illusionistic painted Doric entablature with metopes and triglyphs runs around the top of the room beneath the beam line; painted cornices, friezes and arched frontoncini surmount the four doors. Feigned Doric columns and projecting modillions frame the front-façade openings. On the long western wall, the doorway giving onto the staircase is framed by marmorino-finished pilasters with a stucco architrave; on the opposite eastern wall the identical structure is replicated in fresco, framing a feigned classical hero statue painted en grisaille (perhaps Aeneas). The wall panels between these centres and the lateral doors carry rectangular framings with corner ornaments and may originally have held inset decorative panels, such as painted canvases or perhaps Cordovan gilt-leather hangings.

==== Ground-floor hall (right-hand linking body) ====
A large rectangular hall with a vaulted ceiling, occupying the entire small body of connection between the central block and the right-hand barchessa, linking front garden to rear brolo through portals on its end walls. The vault carries geometric partitions around a feigned octagonal cupola in perspective, with light "Bérain"-type grotesques; trophies of arms, banners, lances, shields, monograms and Loredan stemme run along the springing of the vault, centred on each of the four walls. The two long lateral walls are opened by ample triple-arched architectural framings enclosing fanciful perspectival urban views, populated by monumental classical architectures. Substantial losses and picketing damage have been effectively integrated in neutral tone or chromatic understatement, with only the geometric framings analogically reintegrated.

==== Upper salone (piano nobile) ====
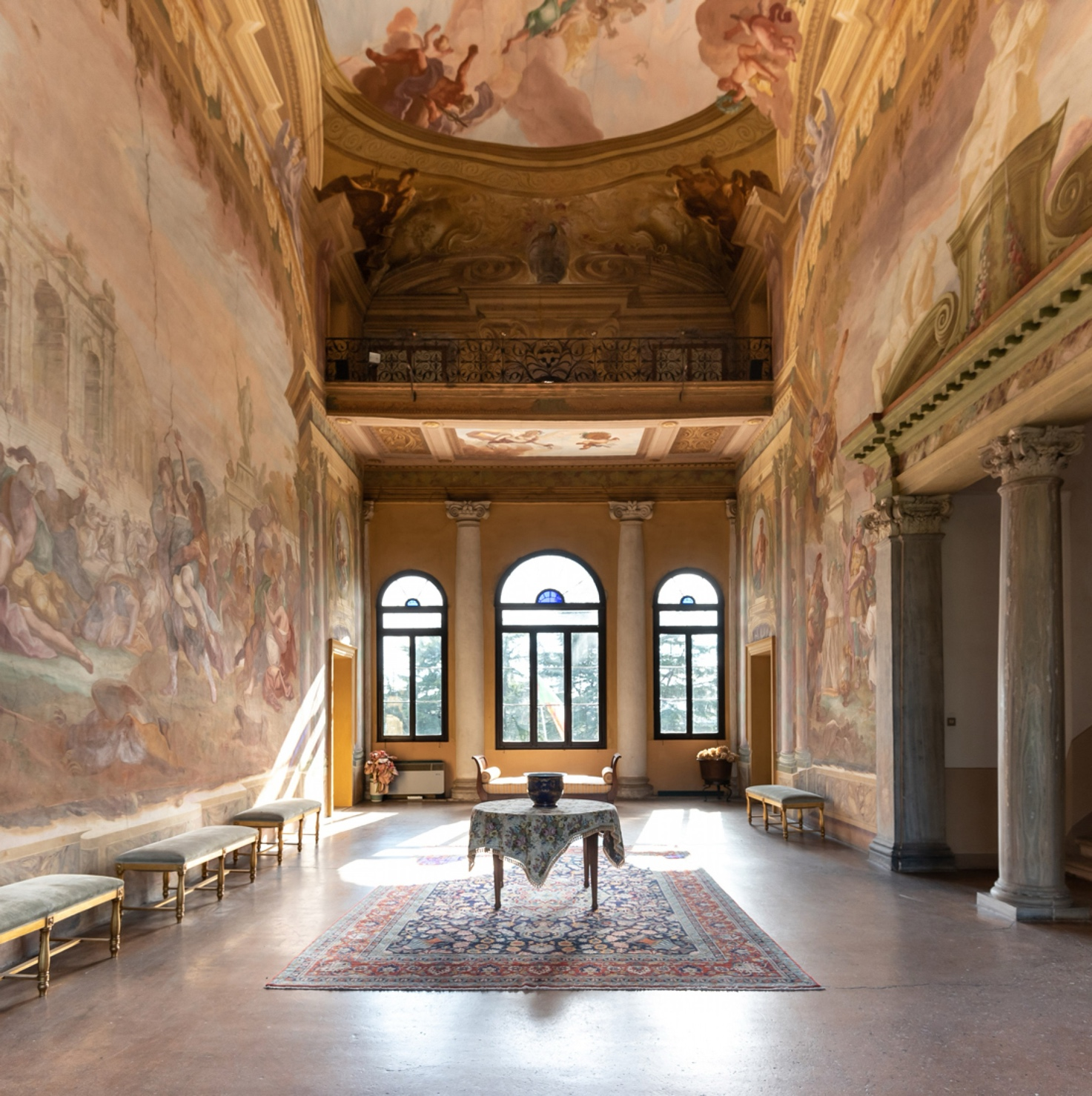
Frescoed double-height hall on the piano nobile.

Inside, on the upper floor, the spectacular double-height hall, with balconies at both ends, is entirely frescoed. The figural decoration was first published in 1967 by Francesca d'Arcais, who attributed it to Niccolò Bambini with a date around 1710. A reattribution to Girolamo Brusaferro (1677–1745) was first proposed by Bernard Aikema in 1986 and subsequently confirmed by Pietropolli (1991 and 2002) on the decisive evidence of preparatory drawings by Brusaferro directly related to the Vascon cycle. The current scholarly consensus dates the cycle to c. 1717–1720, with the figural parts by Brusaferro and the elaborate quadratura or perspectival architecture by unidentified painters very probably from Emilia. The cycle contains extraordinary depictions of episodes of ancient Roman history and is recognized as one of the foremost examples of Baroque pictorial decoration in the Veneto, commissioned by Antonio and Alvise Loredan.

==== North-west chamber, piano nobile ====
A high vaulted ceiling contains a recessed quadrilobate panel painted with Bacchus and Venus, a securely autograph work by Brusaferro. Walls and vault are otherwise covered today by a uniform lime whitewash with no surviving framing around the figured panel, strongly suggesting that the whitewash conceals continuous Baroque framings and ornaments, and possibly further figural passages, in the same idiom as the adjacent salone.

=== The Madonna of Loreto oratory (1719) ===
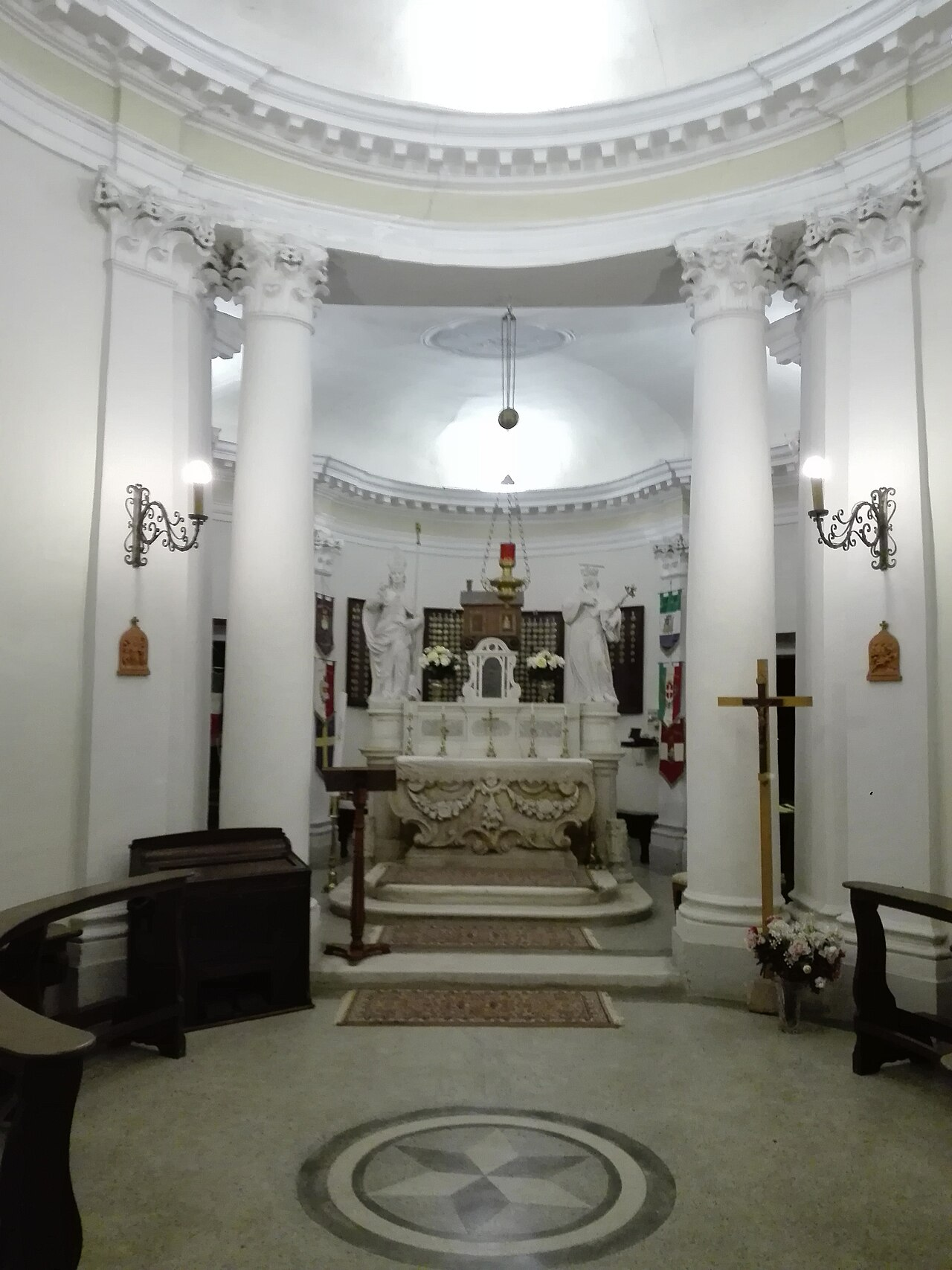
Interior of the oratory of the Madonna of Loreto.

Very remarkable is the original architecture of the public/private oratory facing the front road, detached from the villa and consecrated on 24 October 1719 by Fortunato Morosini, Bishop of Treviso. The construction of the oratory probably marked the conclusion of the general renovation of the villa complex. As is typical in Veneto villas, the oratory served a double purpose: public, with direct access from the external road, and private to the proprietor family, accessed from the garden.

The dedication to the Madonna of Loreto again connects the building to Antonio Loredan's role at Corfu, since it recalls the solemn public vow made by the Republic to the Lauretan sanctuary in those grave circumstances. The small all-white building has a markedly original plan. A small pronaos projects toward the road, adorned externally with pilasters and two columns of fine grey marble supporting a classical triangular tympanum above an arched portal (its keystone bearing a finely carved cherub head). The portal, closed by elegant Baroque iron grille leaves, gives onto a circular hall articulated by Corinthian pilasters in marmorino, supporting a perimeter cornice on which sits a strongly depressed dome; beyond a tight pair of Corinthian columns, the presbytery widens into an unusual tricora structure with a united triple apse. This internal play of spaces is reflected externally in the modulation of variously convex wall and volume surfaces, making the Vascon oratory one of the most experimental and inventive examples of "small-format" Veneto architecture of those years.

An external bell-cot with stone volutes rises from the central apse. The cylindrical central body is roofed in three stepped tiers of radial tiles, with a 19th-century masonry plinth and small stone angel at the apex; the plinth replaced an original small glazed lantern with cupola that lit the interior through the round circular oculus still present at the centre of the depressed dome (now closed by a later panel with a raised star).

Inside, the small isolated altar in the presbytery carries a beautiful marble paliotto, vigorously carved with volutes and festoons of fruit and flowers on inlays of variegated marbles, certainly the work of the Tagliapietra workshop, and closely comparable, though smaller, to the altar of the parish church of Vascon (a church much favoured by the Loredan, where the young Giambattista Tiepolo frescoed the presbytery in 1722). On the altar, flanking the tabernacle, stand two notable marble statues of Saint Anthony and Saint Louis of Toulouse (Saint Ludovic, "Alvise" in Venetian), the name-saints of Antonio and Alvise Loredan, also attributable to Alvise Tagliapietra. A more elaborate Baroque setting referring to the Holy House of Loreto was stolen some years ago; a modest wooden casetta on the tabernacle is the only surviving reference today.

=== Sculptures by Alvise Tagliapietra ===
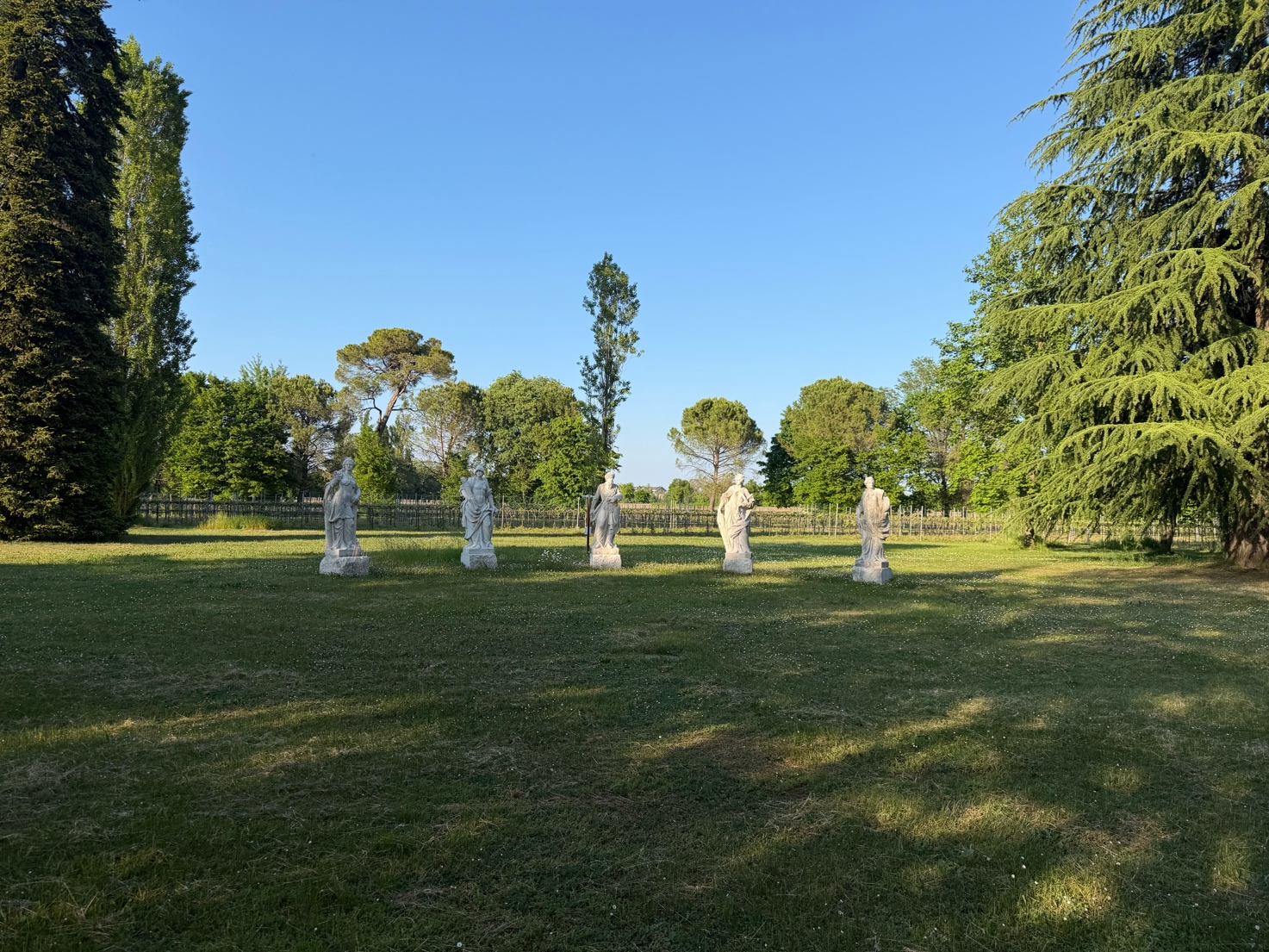
Allegorical statues attributed to Alvise Tagliapietra in the park.

Six over-life-size statues in white Istrian stone survive within the villa precinct: formerly placed atop the masonry pillars of the front roadside enclosure, they have recently been redisposed in an apse-like arrangement on the rear lawn. Four represent the canonical Cardinal virtues (Fortitude, Justice, Prudence and Temperance); the remaining two have been tentatively identified as Military Valour (or Courage) and Victorious Good Command.

Following recent cleaning of a heavy biological surface patina, the statues have been confidently attributed to the Venetian sculptor Alvise Tagliapietra (1670–1747), or his prolific workshop, which worked both for Venice and for international patrons (notably Saint Petersburg, where Tagliapietra produced the Justice for the Hermitage staircase). The attribution is supported by transparent comparisons with the artist's documented "garden" works, and is reinforced by the choice of costly Istrian stone (rather than the cheaper Vicenza pietra tenera usual for garden statuary), a choice consistent with the precisely allegorical, celebratory programme alluding to Antonio Loredan himself. The current placement, on the 19th-century Valier-era pillars, did not exploit the relative proximity of viewing for which the figures were conceived. It is plausible that the six were originally arranged three by three along the conjectural double-flight external staircase, ascending the visitor toward the loggia and salone in an almost initiatory route from garden to celebratory frescoed hall.

Several elegant Istrian-stone urn-shaped decorative vases, two on the front enclosure pillars flanking the roadside "peschiera" and a third on the north-east corner pillar of the walled enclosure, appear stylistically consistent with Tagliapietra. Three further allegorical statues of the Seasons (Autumn and Spring in the front garden; Summer isolated in a copse in the rear garden) are 18th-century works of decent but not outstanding quality, said to have been brought to Vascon by the Perocco family in the mid-20th century from another of their properties; they are therefore not historically pertinent to the villa.

=== Brolo and gardens ===
The 1713 map already shows the manor positioned toward the south-west side of the large walled quadrangle, which survives integrally: a characteristic Veneto feature, with the larger area at the rear of the villa traditionally dedicated to a brolo (productive orchard). The Austrian cadastral map of c. 1830–1840 still reveals a great perspectival cannocchiale axis crossing the entire rear brolo on the manor's axis to the north-east enclosure wall, almost certainly defined, in the Veneto tradition, by a double tree avenue.

The south-west front side onto the public road carries a 19th-century enclosure (probably by the Valier), partly in solid wall, partly with low masonry, fine Baroque-revival wrought-iron grilles, and pillars carrying the stone statues (now moved inside for safety) and decorative vases. A spring-fed water ditch along this frontage, almost a small peschiera, runs directly in front of the manor and barchesse façades. The oratory advances its small pronaos into a semicircular esedra described by the enclosure, terminated at the ends by two pillars.

No graphic documentation of the original 18th-century garden layout (maps, plans) is at present available, so the original divisions can only be deduced from existing elements and from the architecture itself. The arrangement was certainly of regular and airy geometry with strict symmetry, in the Veneto manner, by then strongly influenced by French models. Two probable rectilinear "green walls" (likely tall hornbeam hedges) are inferable between the ends of the built front and the road enclosure; two parallel longitudinal paths are still legible, crossing the building perpendicularly through the small linking bodies and so connecting front and rear gardens. Between these two axes, both preserved until the 1950s and 1960s, as visible in aerial photographs, a wide geometric Baroque parterre is plausibly to be located in front of the central block; this was simplified between the late 19th and early 20th centuries into a single path with central rotunda, later obliterated but still legible "sotto-prato".

== Later ownership: 19th–20th centuries ==
- 1856: Vincenzo Loredan sells the villa.
- 1859: a contemporary source notes the "magnificent palace of the Loredan, with oratory dedicated to the Blessed Virgin of Loreto, of circular plan, covered by a dome", deploring how visibly "the damages of time" already affect both the chapel and the sumptuous building.
- 1860–1867: the villa is owned by a Jewish merchant named Cuti.
- 1867–1940: the villa, in poor condition, is purchased by the Venetian patrician Ottaviano Valier; the Valier family carry out restoration and several substantial modifications and alterations (including, very probably, the partial infill of the open Ionic loggia of the upper salone, the present front roadside enclosure, and the placement of the Tagliapietra statues on its pillars).
- 1940: sold to a Pacor of Trieste.
- c. 1945: owned by the Stocco family. In the various ownership changes preceding 1951 the villa was vandalised, with "detached fresco medallions" reportedly removed for sale on the antiques market.
- 1951: the villa is purchased by Count Ing. Tullio Perocco di Meduna, whose family undertakes its renovation and still owns it today. The villa is not open to the public.

== Attribution and scholarship ==
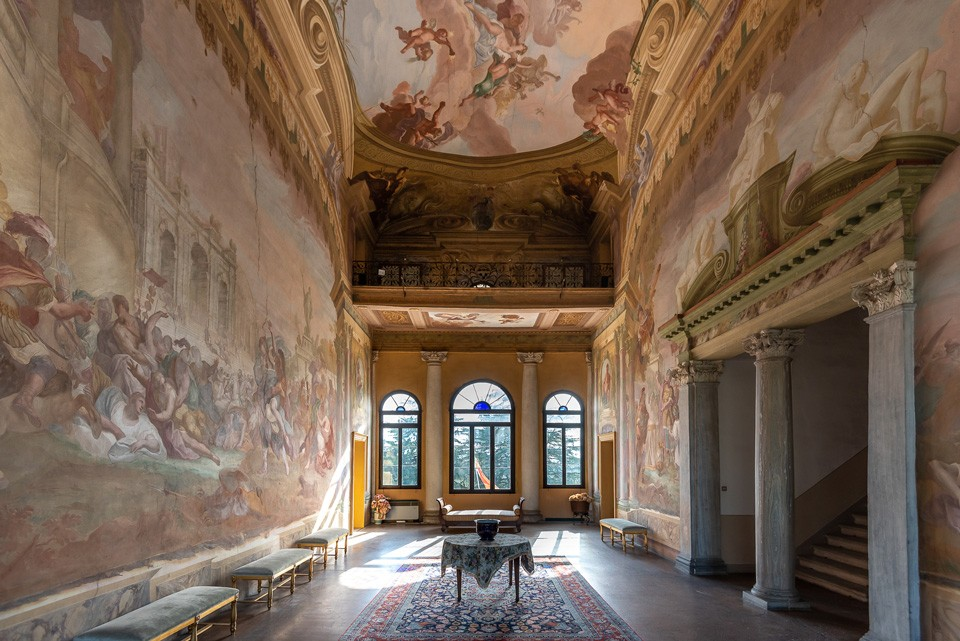
Fresco cycle in the upper salone, attributed to Girolamo Brusaferro.

The villa occupies a special place in modern Veneto art history almost exclusively on account of the well-preserved fresco decoration of the upper salone, today unanimously assigned to Girolamo Brusaferro for the figural parts, c. 1717–1720, with quadratura by unknown painters probably from Emilia. The attribution history runs from Francesca d'Arcais's first publication in 1967 (in favour of Niccolò Bambini, c. 1710), through Bernard Aikema's dissenting proposal in 1986, to Pietropolli's confirmation of Brusaferro in 1991 and 2002 on the basis of newly identified preparatory drawings.

Other significant aspects of the complex, such as the late 17th-century manor under Zuanne Loredan, the early 18th-century symmetrical reconfiguration with barchesse, loggia and salone-auditorium, the Tagliapietra statuary, the 1719 Madonna of Loreto oratory, and the survival of the walled brolo aligned to the Roman centuriation, have until recently been largely neglected by scholarship; the most extensive historical-critical synthesis is the study by Andrea Bellieni cited below, intended as a "first-draft atlas" pending fuller archival research, especially in the private Loredan di San Vio archive.

== Bibliography ==
- A. Bellieni, Villa Loredan, Valier, Perocco di Meduna a Vascon di Carbonera. Primi contributi storico-critici.
- F. Monicelli, S. Montagner, Guida alle ville venete, Demetra, Verona, 2000.
- G. Scarpari, Le ville venete, Newton Compton, Rome, 2007.
- G. Pavanello (ed.), Gli affreschi nelle Ville Venete, vol. II, 2011.
- G. Mazzotti, Le Ville Venete – Catalogo, Treviso, 1952.
- F. Morandin, [studies on Vascon], 1992.
- Carta Archeologica del Veneto, F. 38.
