= Santa Teresa, Mantua =

Italian church

Santa Teresa Church
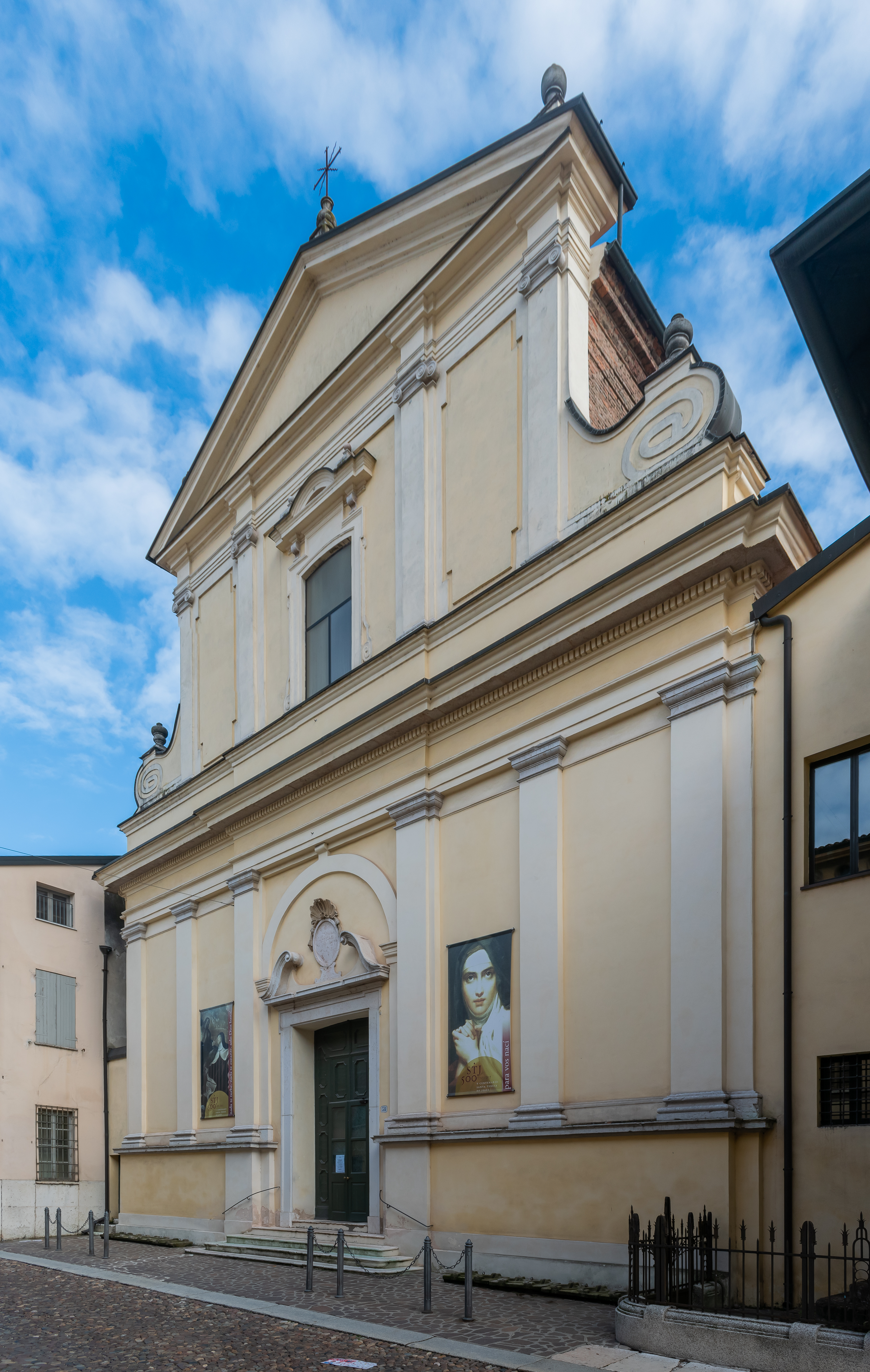
- Façade

Religion
- Affiliation: Roman Catholic

Location
- Location: Mantua, Italy
- Interactive map of Santa Teresa Church
- Coordinates: 45°9′11.35″N 10°47′27.56″E

Architecture
- Type: Church
- Style: Baroque
- Groundbreaking: 1668

Website
- www.santateresamantova.it

Santa Teresa Church is a Catholic place of worship in the city of Mantua founded and currently officiated by the Discalced Carmelites; it is dedicated to their founder, Saint Teresa of Avila, and to Saint Joseph.

== History ==
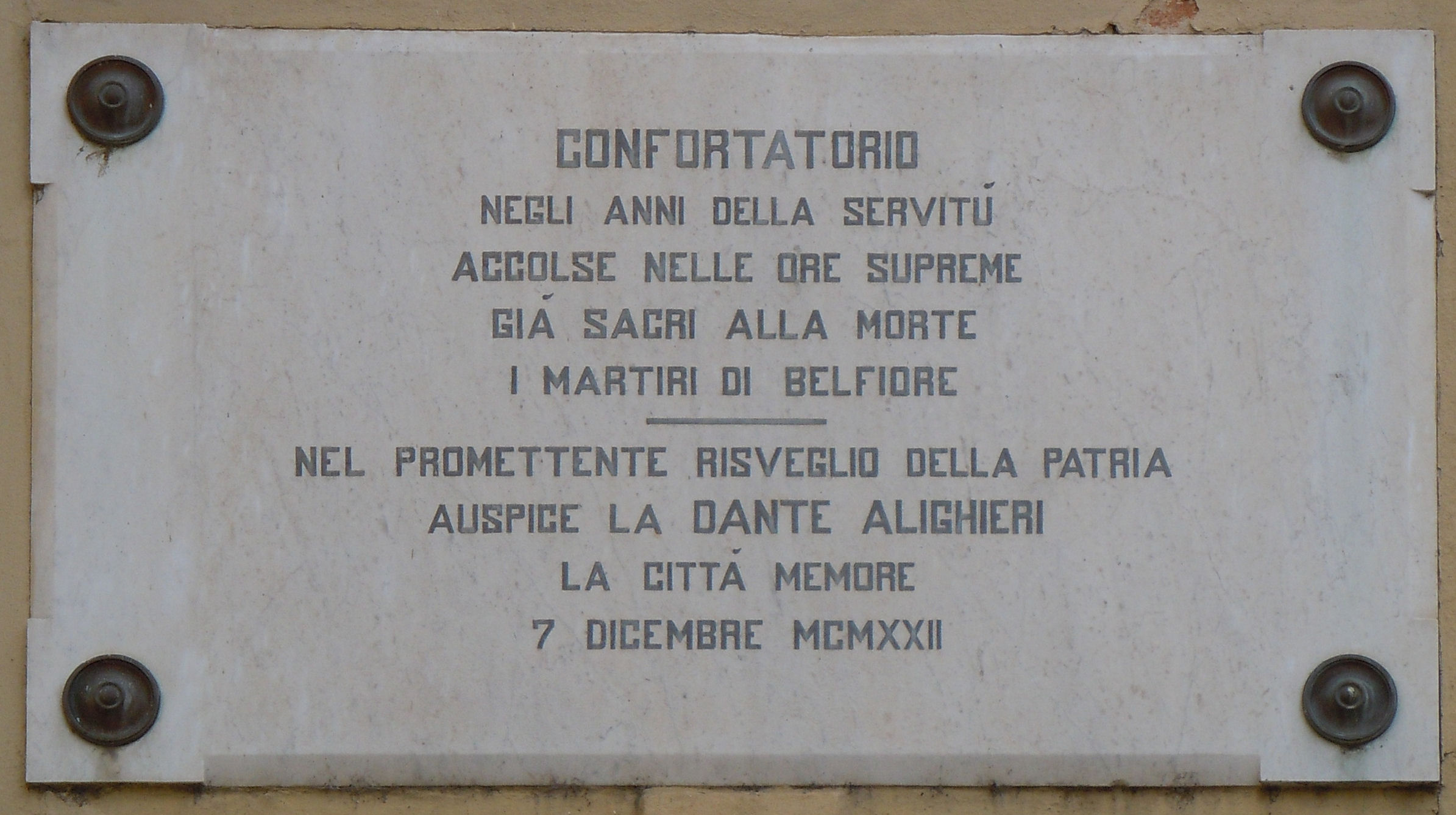
Plaque in memory of the Belfiore Martyrs

The friars arrived in Mantua in 1646 on the initiative of the Duchess Maria Gonzaga, and settled in the convent of San Nicolò near the Gradaro (now disappeared). A few years later they were given a more central area adjacent to the Carmelino Church, where they founded the new convent (starting in 1661) and, in 1668, the church. As a result of the suppression of religious orders under the First French Empire, in 1805 the convent was requisitioned and destined for military use.

It was later used as a prison by the Austrians. Here some of the Italian patriots known as “Belfiore martyrs” were jailed before their hanging at Belfiore, on the shore of Lago Superiore.

The religious complex was restored to its original purpose under the Kingdom of Italy, at the end of the century, hosting the Jesuits; later, in 1936, the Discalced Carmelites returned.

== Description ==
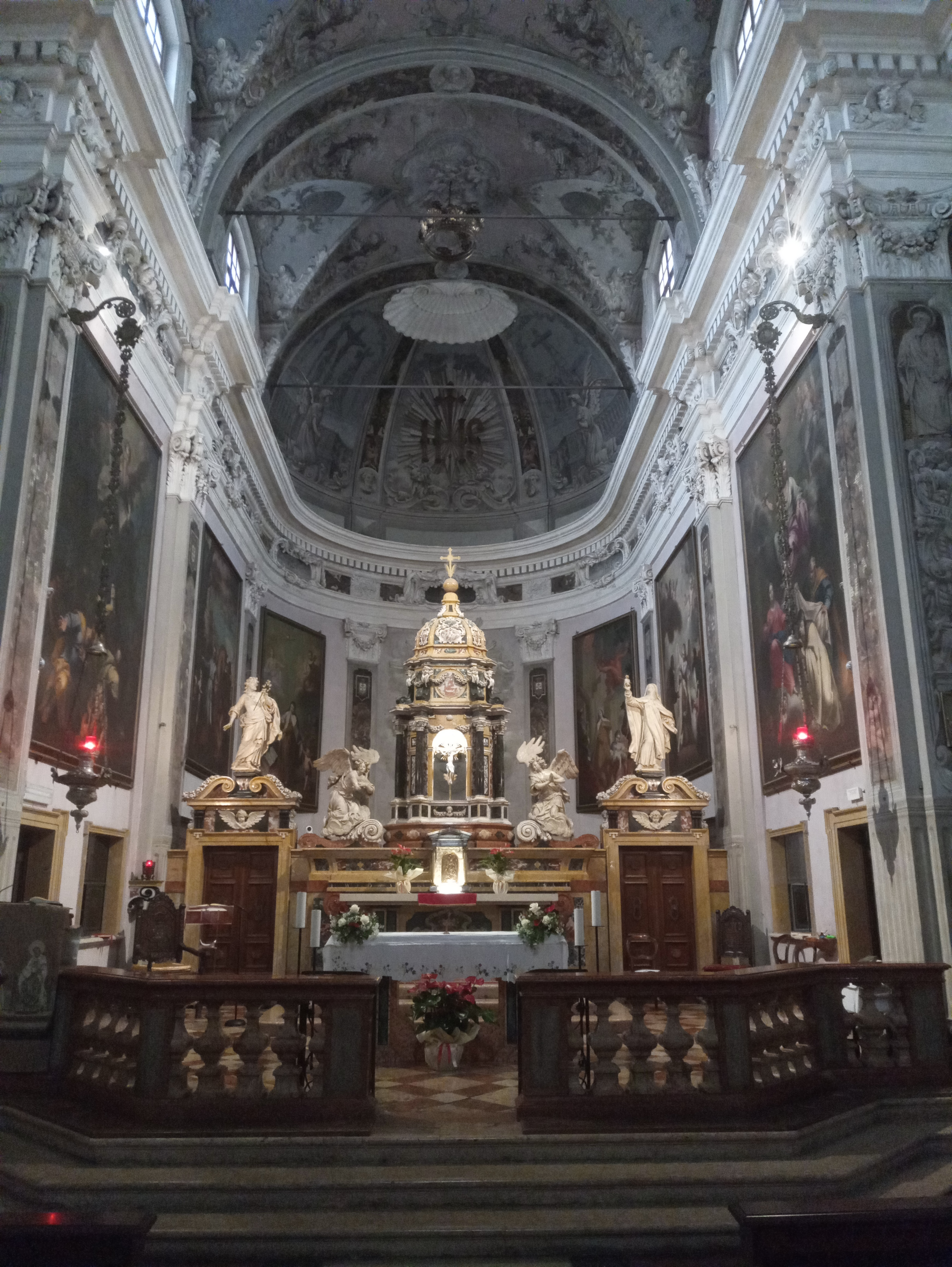
Presbytery

The church, which presents itself externally with a simple and austere façade, expresses its Baroque origins internally: the chapels (two for each side), the nave, the apse and the presbytery are richly decorated with stucco reliefs, wrought iron gates and polychrome marble. On the twelve lesenes of the nave and on the vault are depicted in chiaroscuro the Savior, the Apostles, Jesuit saints and blessed.

The chapels on the right are dedicated to Saint John of the Cross, co-patron of the city (painting by Girolamo Brusaferro, after 1728), and to Our Lady of Mount Carmel (wooden statue by Ferdinando Perathoner Junior, 1956). Those on the left to the Holy Family (with a statue of Saint Therese of the Child Jesus) and to Saint Teresa of Avila (canvas by Domenico Canuti with Jesus Appearing to Saint Teresa of Avila, c. 1680).

The high altar, with a sumptuous ciborium for the display of the Blessed Sacrament, and the side portals are works in polychrome marble by Giovanni Battista Bianchi (1688). They are decorated with statues of the titular saints and of two angels, carved in wood by the Mantuan Guglielmo Dolce (1690). On the walls of the presbytery and the choir are placed six large oil paintings by Filippo Gherardi with episodes from the life of Saint Teresa (c. 1680).

== See also ==
- Belfiore martyrs
