= Tagliapietra =

Tagliapietra (pronounced [taʎʎaˈpjɛːtra]) is an Italian surname, literally translating to 'stone-cutter'. People with the surname include:

- Aldo Tagliapietra (born 1945), Italian pop musician
- Alvise Tagliapietra (1670–1747), Italian baroque sculptor
- Gino Tagliapietra (1887–1954), Italian pianist and composer, editor of works by Ferruccio Busoni
- Guia Maria Tagliapietra (born 1998), Italian figure skater
- Lino Tagliapietra (born 1934), Italian glass artist
- Lucas Tagliapietra (born 1990), Brazilian football player
- Robert Tagliapietra, American fashion designer, co-founder of the fashion house Costello Tagliapietra
- Sergio Tagliapietra (1935–2022), Italian rower
