= Tommaso Rues =

Italian sculptor (1636–1703)

Tommaso Rues (1636 – 1703) was a Baroque sculptor active mainly in Venice; he contributed many of the statues outside of the church of the Salute. His works can be seen in a number of other Venetian churches including the Redentore, San Pantalon, and San Clemente.

== Biography ==
He was born in Bruneck in the Southern Tyrol to a local sculptor, but by the age of 14 arrived in Venice as apprentice to a tailor, but soon apprenticed to the wood carver Giovanni Hach. He worked with Hach for eight years, but then became one of a group of sculptors active at times under the leadership of the Flemish Josse de Corte, including Heinrich Meyring, Giovanni Bonazza, Michele Fabris (l’Ongaro), and Melchior Barthel. Barthel was a close friend. Tommaso died in Venice.

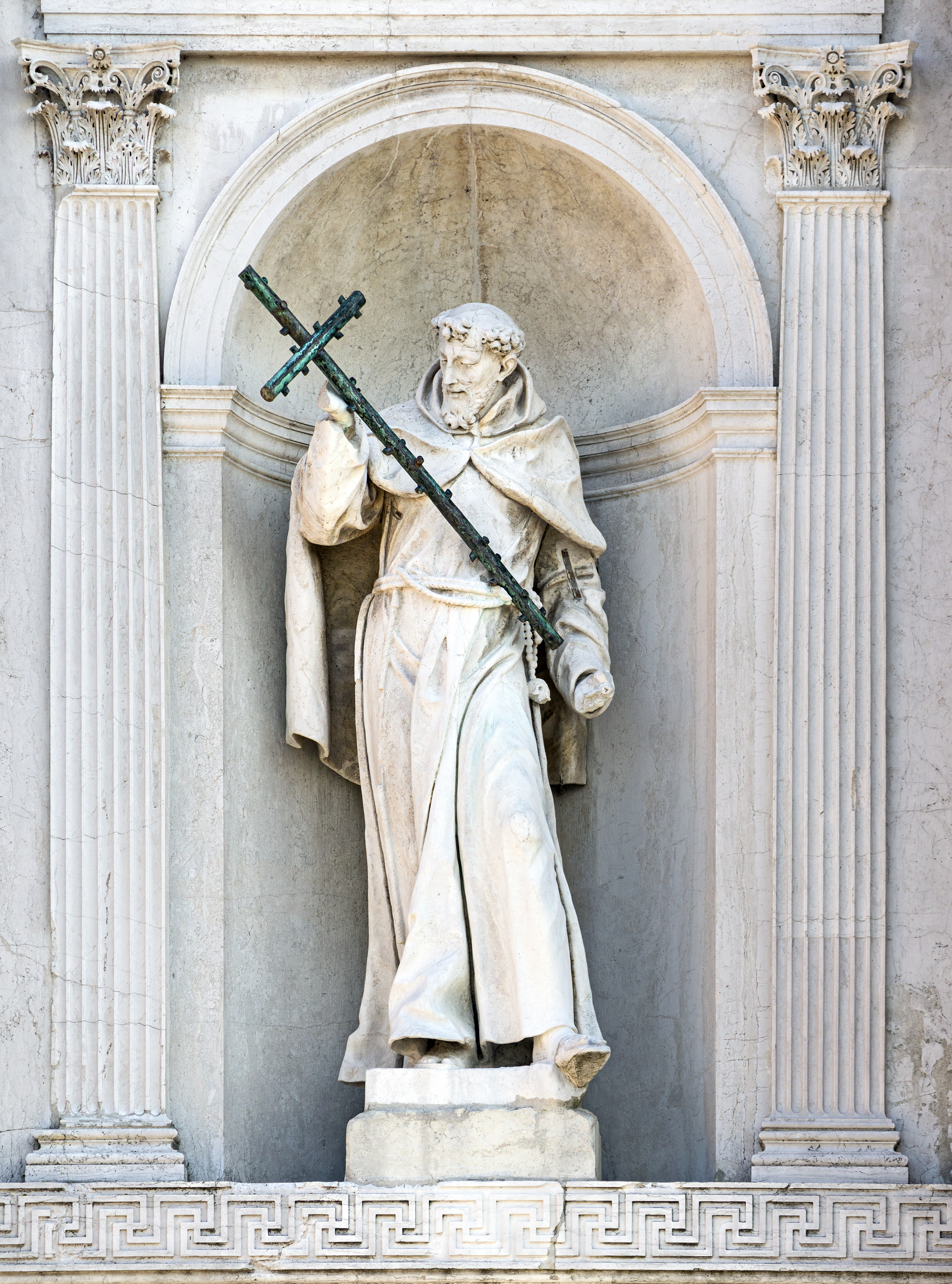
Francis of Assisi - Il Redentore, in Venice

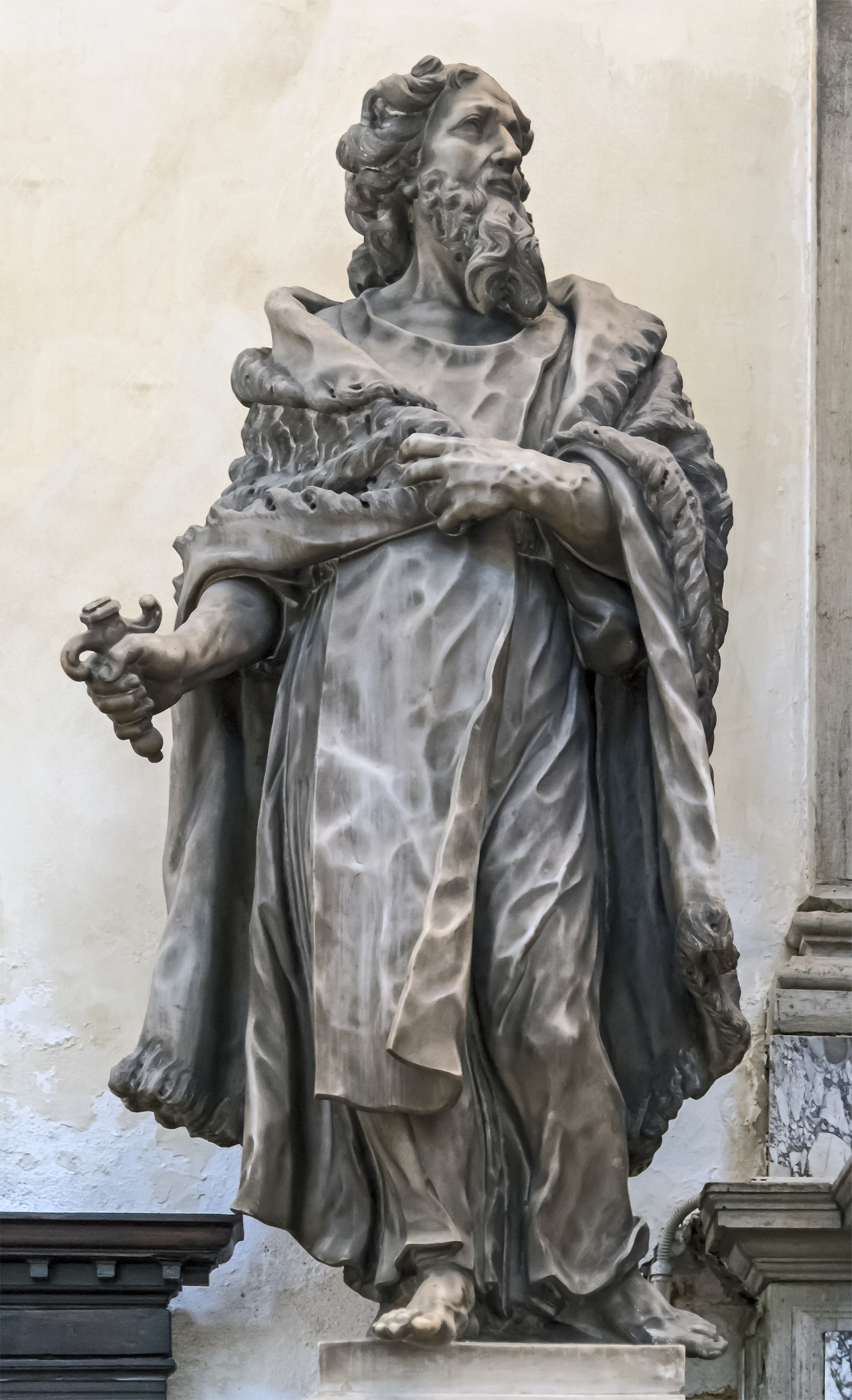
Elijah - Santa Maria dei Carmini in Venice

Statues depicting Evangelists John, Mark, Luke and Matthew in Santa Maria della Salute

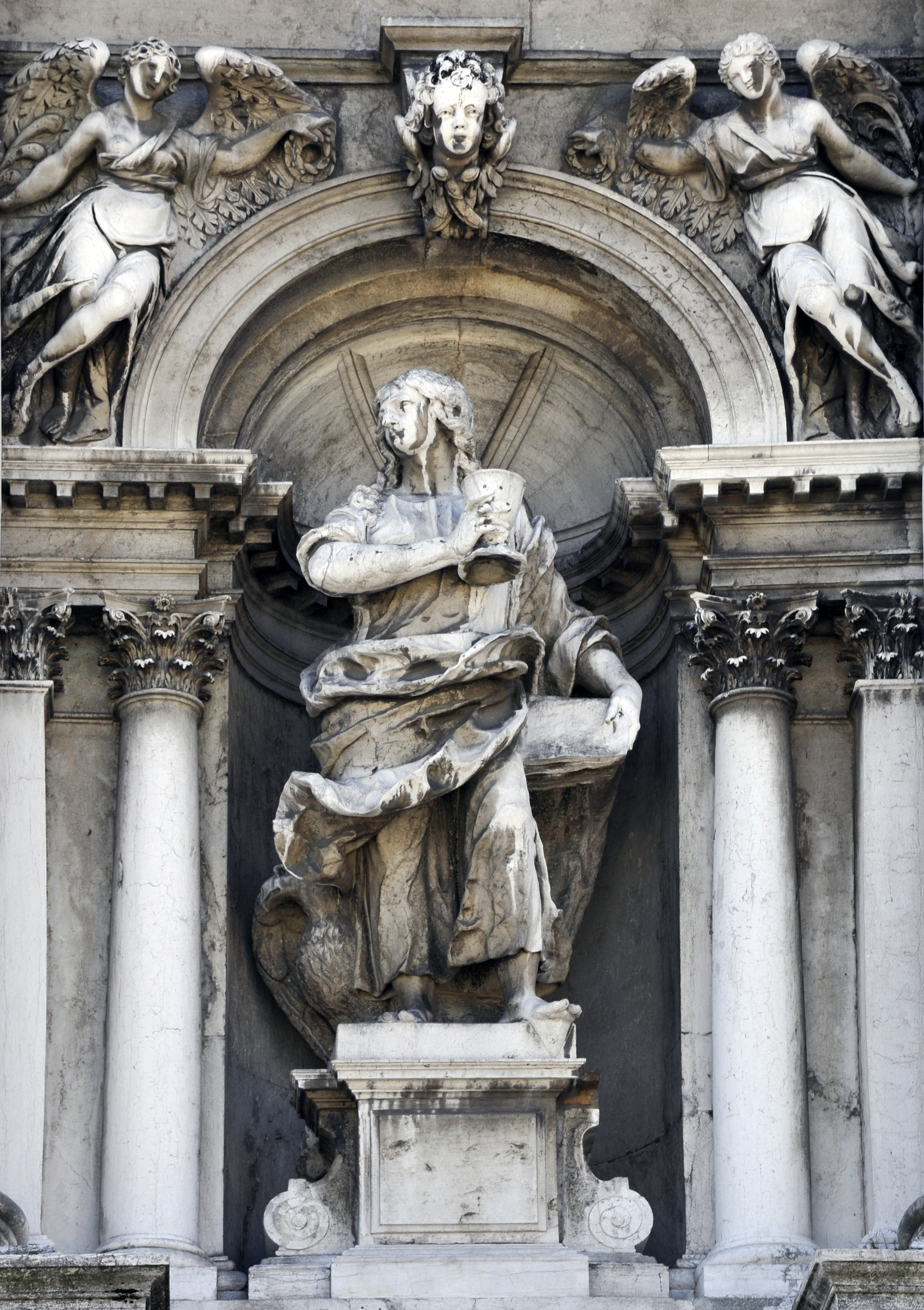

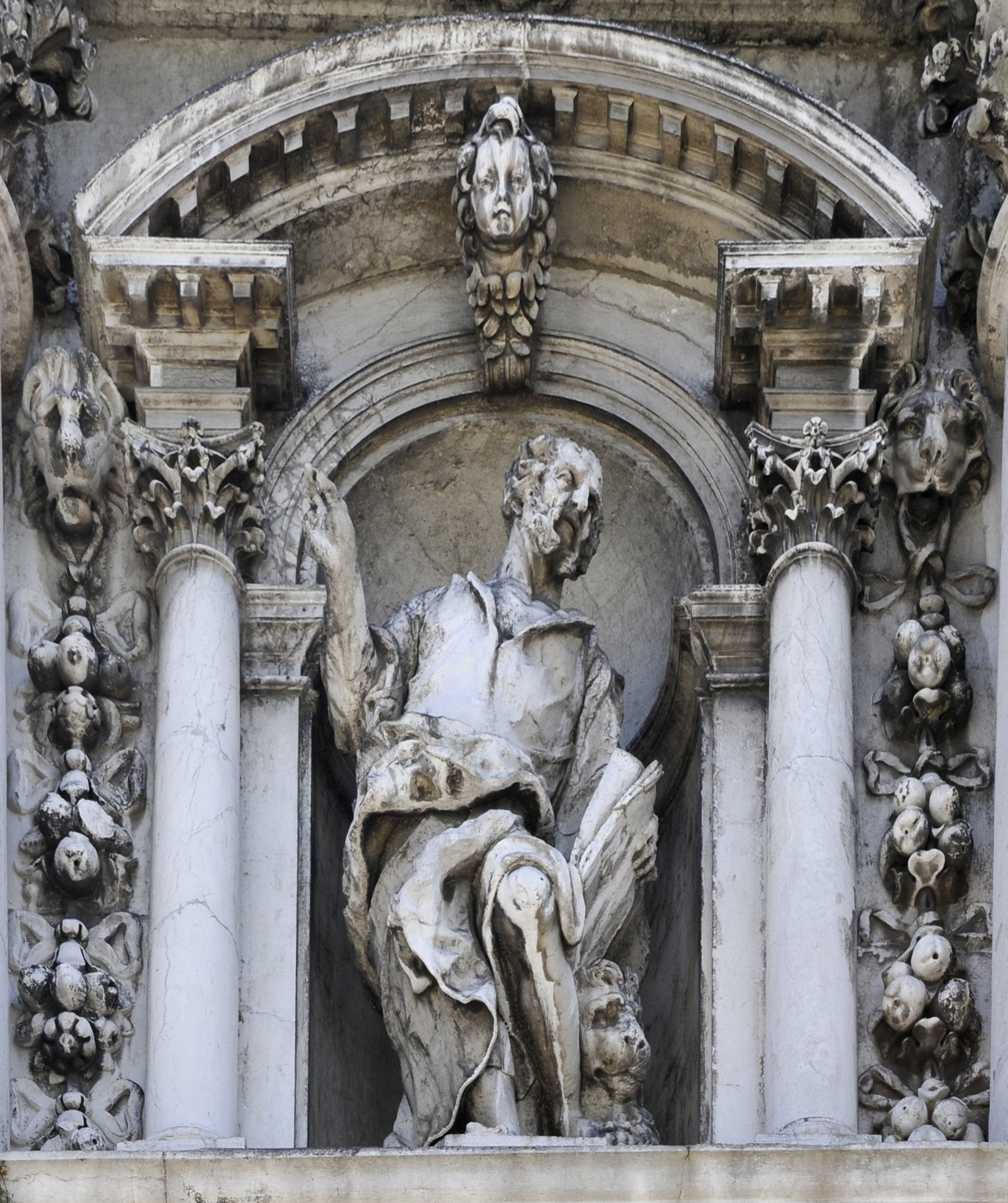

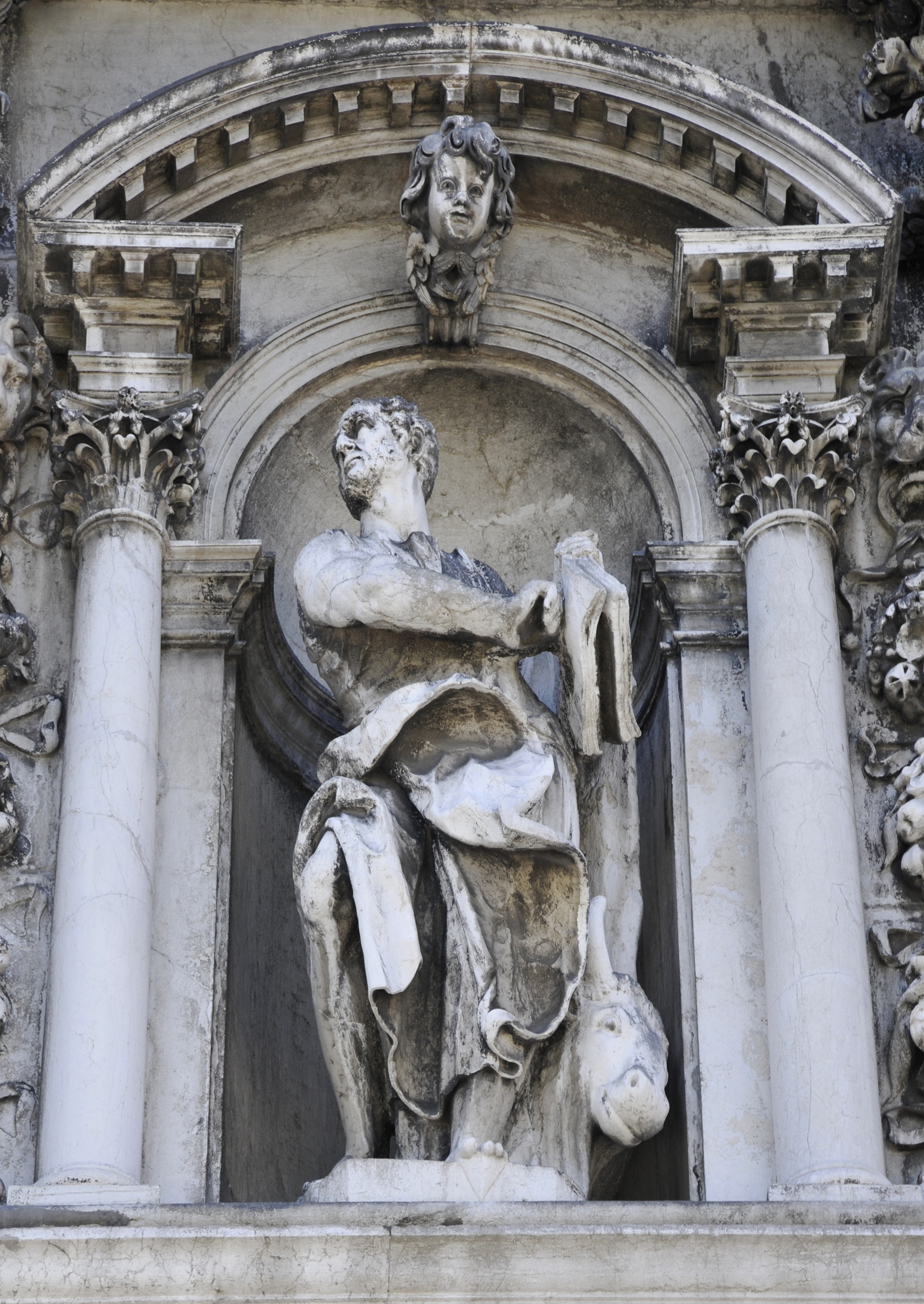

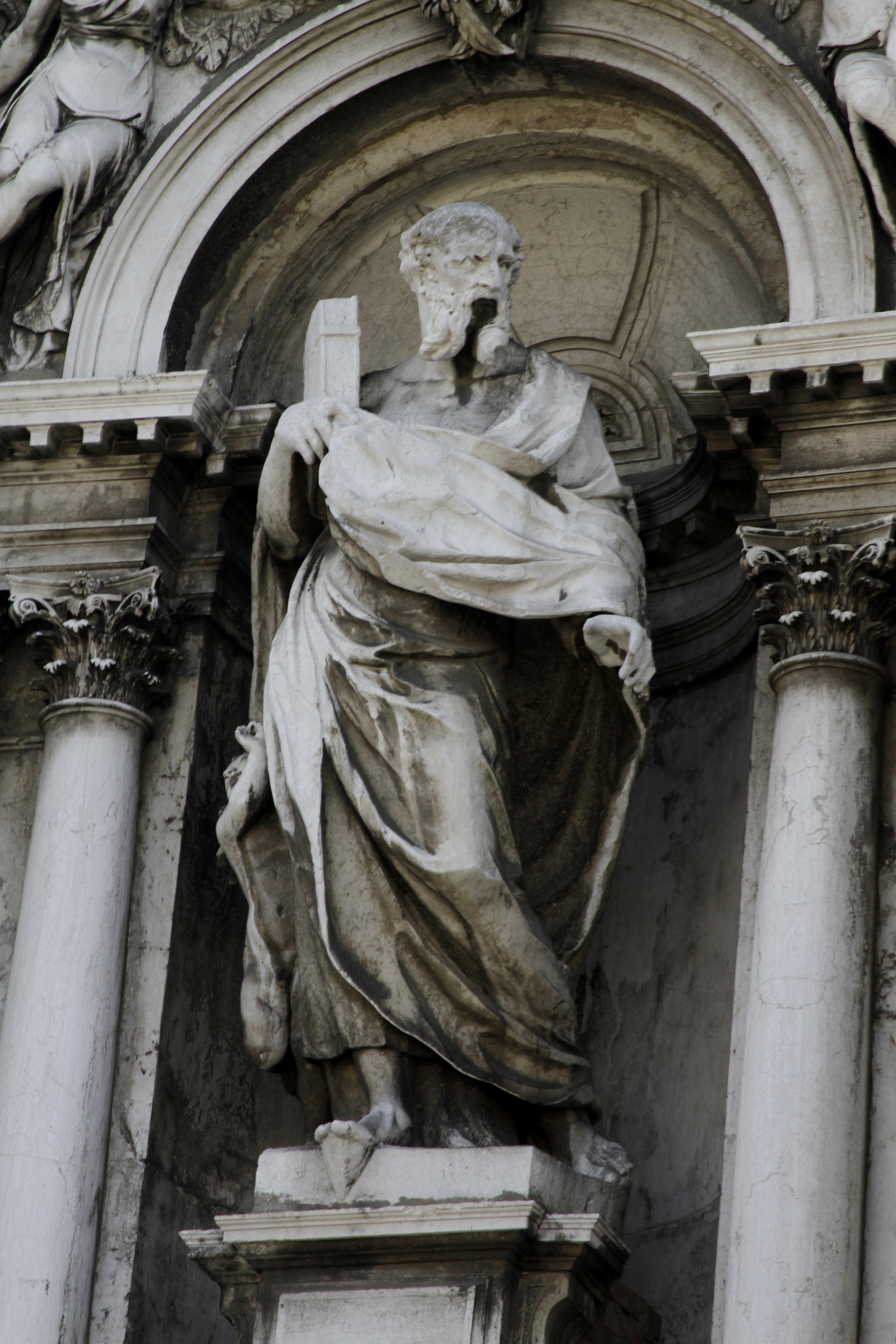
