= Carmini =

Church building in Venice, Italy

Coordinates: 45.4332°N 12.3225°E

Church of Santa Maria dei Carmini
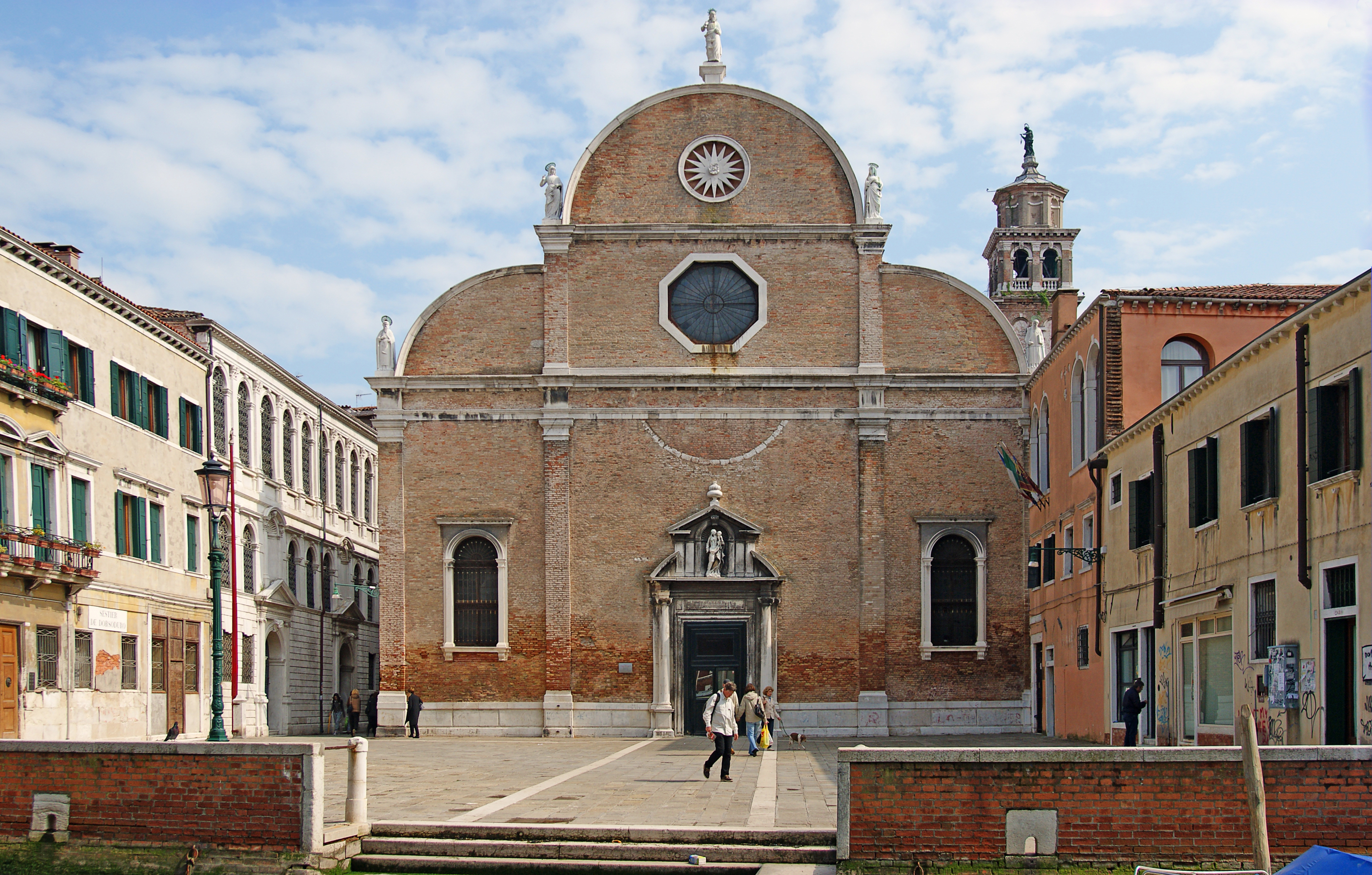
- Santa Maria dei Carmini
- Church of Santa Maria dei Carmini
- Country: Italy
- Denomination: Roman Catholic
- Website: parrocchiedorsoduro.it/index.php/2025/12/carmini/

History
- Consecrated: 1348

Architecture
- Style: Venetian Gothic
- Groundbreaking: 1286
- Completed: 1514

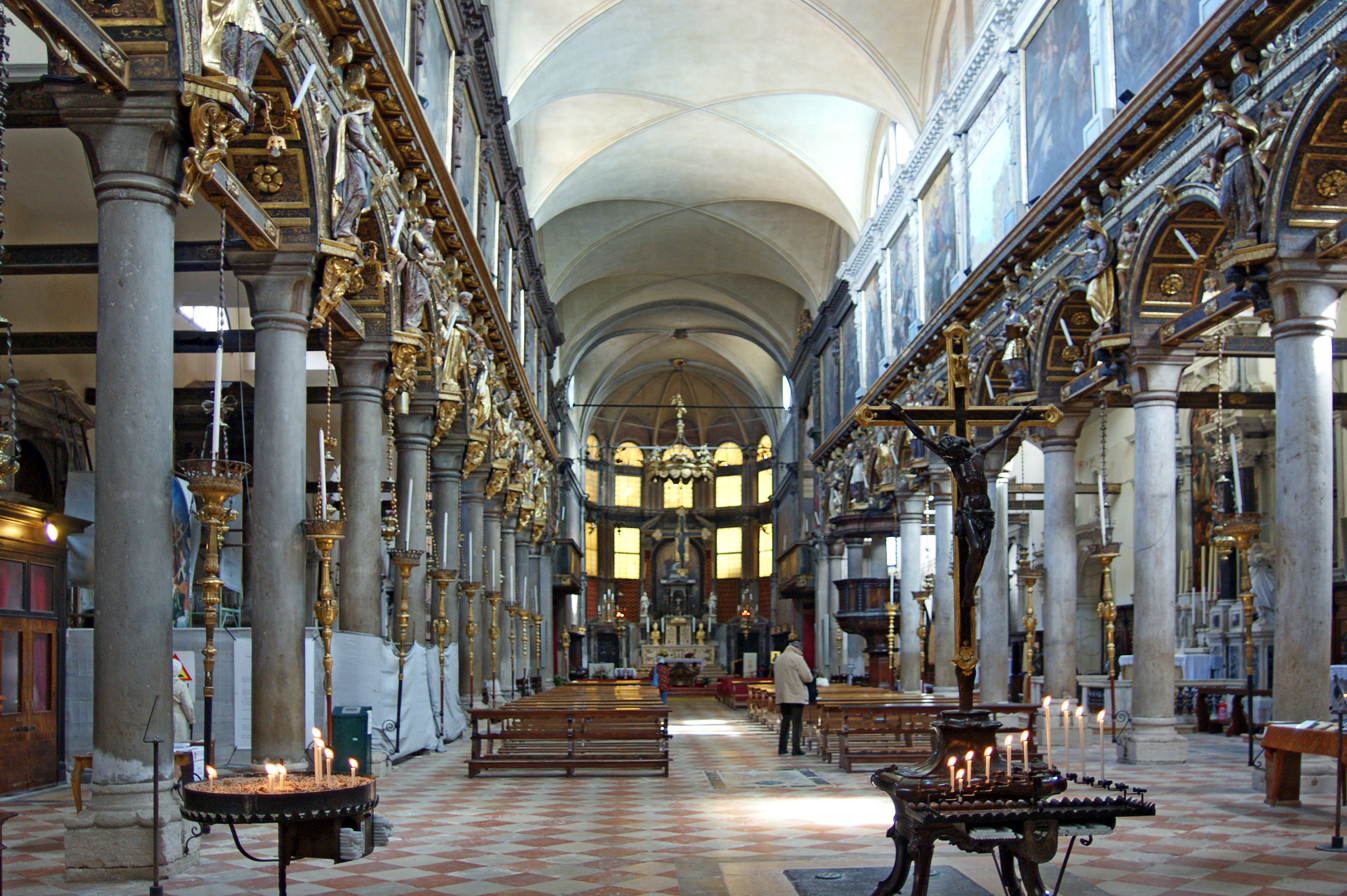
Interior view.

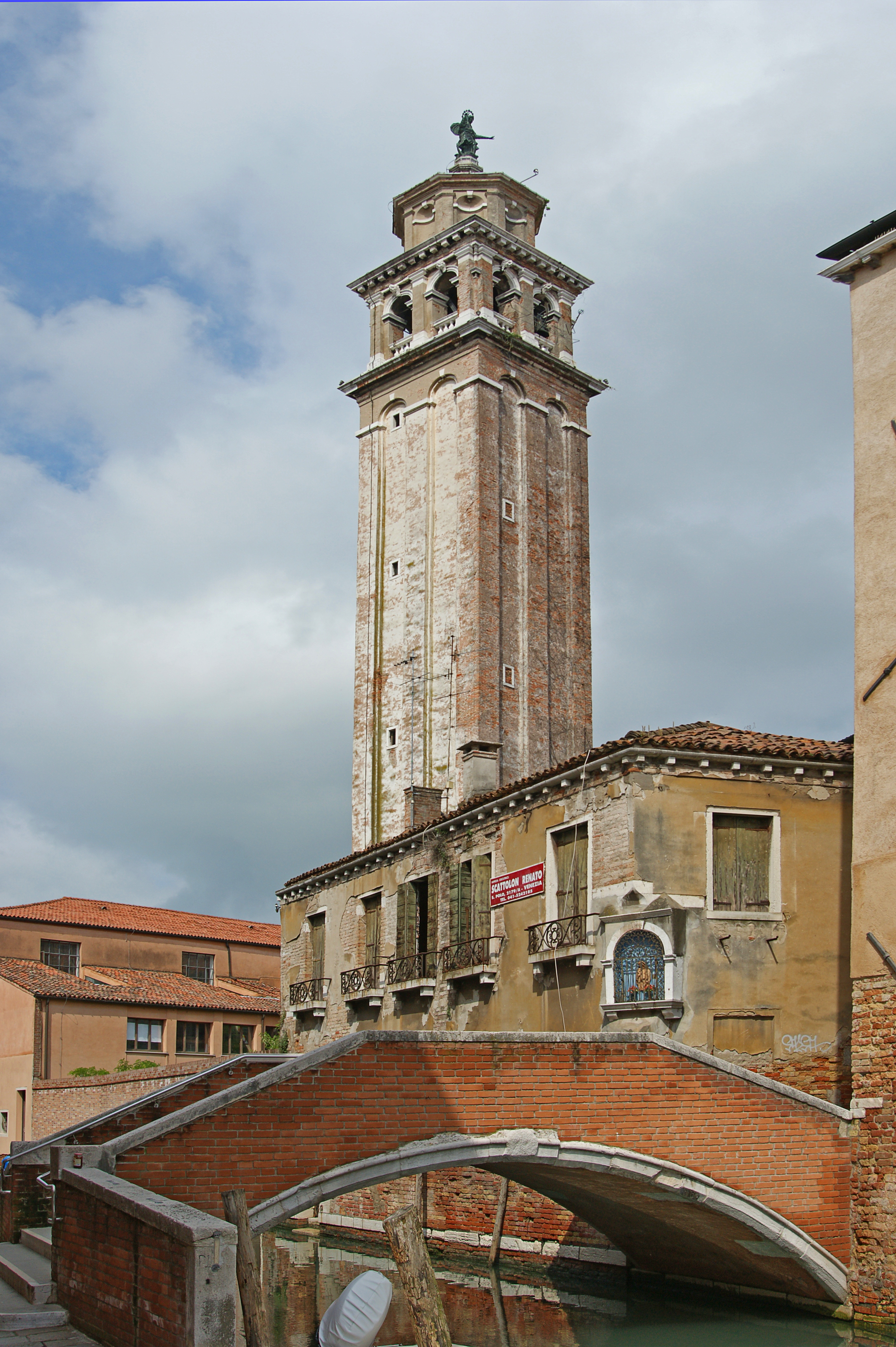
The bell tower.

Santa Maria dei Carmini, also called Santa Maria del Carmelo and commonly known simply as the Carmini, is a large Roman Catholic church in the sestiere, or neighbourhood, of Dorsoduro in Venice, northern Italy. It nestles against the former Scuola Grande di Santa Maria del Carmelo, also known as the Scuola dei Carmini. This charitable confraternity was officially founded in 1597, and arose from a lay women's charitable association, the Pinzocchere dei Carmini. The members of this lay group were associated as tertiaries to the neighbouring Carmelite monastery. They were responsible for stitching the scapulars for the Carmelites.

== History ==
The church originally was called Santa Maria Assunta, and first dated to the 14th century (circa 1348). The brick and marble facade contains sculpted lunettes by Giovanni Buora. Among the roofline decorations are images of Elisha and Elijah, thought to be founders of the Carmelite order. The bell tower, designed by Giuseppe Sardi, is topped by a statue of the Madonna del Carmine sculpted in 1982 as a replacement by Romano Vio. The previous original was destroyed by lightning.

== Description ==
The chancel and side chapels in the interior were rebuilt in 1507-14 by Sebastiano Mariani from Lugano. The counter-facade has a large monument (1602) to Jacopo Foscarini who was a procurator of San Marco, admiral of the fleet, and whose family palace lies across the canal.

The second altar on the right has an altarpiece depicting the Adoration of the Shepherds (1509–11) by Cima da Conegliano.

The third altar on the right has a Madonna del Carmelo with saints (1595) by Pase Pace and Giovanni Fontana.

The statues of Virginity (left) and Humility on the right of the nave were completed (1722–1723) by Antonio Corradini and Giuseppe Torritti respectively. The bronze angels on the balustrade are by Girolamo Campagna. The wooden frontal represents the Miracles of the Madonna (1724) and was carved by Francesco Bernadoni. The Tabernacle is by Giovanni Scalfarotto.

The fourth altar on the right has the funereal monument to Andrea Civran (1572), a Venetian general.

The Glorification of the Scapular (1709) was frescoed by Sebastiano Ricci on the nave ceiling. The stucco work was completed by Pietro Bianchini to designs of Abbondio Stazio. In the fresco, the angels uphold a scapular, and a painted inscription say it is an ornament of Mt Carmel.

The fourth altar on the left, past the entry to the sacristy, was erected by the guild of the Compravendi Pesce or fishmongers (1548) with an altarpiece depicting the Presentation of Jesus at the Temple (1541–1542) by a young Jacopo Tintoretto.

The third chapel on the left has an altarpiece depicting the Lamentation of the Dead Christ (c. 1476) by Francesco di Giorgio Martini. In front of the chancel are paintings by Marco Vicentino, Palma il Giovane, and Gaspare Diziani.

The second altar on the left has two statues depicting the prophets Elijah and Elisha by Tommaso Rues. Elijah holds a flaming sword. The first altar has a painting of St Nicholas of Bari in Glory between St John the Baptist and St Lucy (1529) by Lorenzo Lotto.

The upper register of the nave is lined with 24 large canvases from the 1666-1730s, painted by artists such as Giovanni Antonio Pellegrini, Gaspare Diziani, Girolamo Brusaferro and Pietro Liberi. The choirs includes 3 paintings (c. 1545) by Andrea Meldolla.

Near the entrance to the cloister is a relief of the Madonna and Child (1340) by Arduino Tagliapietra.

== Sources ==
- Manno, Antonio (2004). The Rizzoli Art Guides (ed.). The Treasures of Venice. New York: Rizzoli International Publications. pp. 532–535.
