= Carbonera, Veneto =

Carbonera
- Comune
- Comune di Carbonera
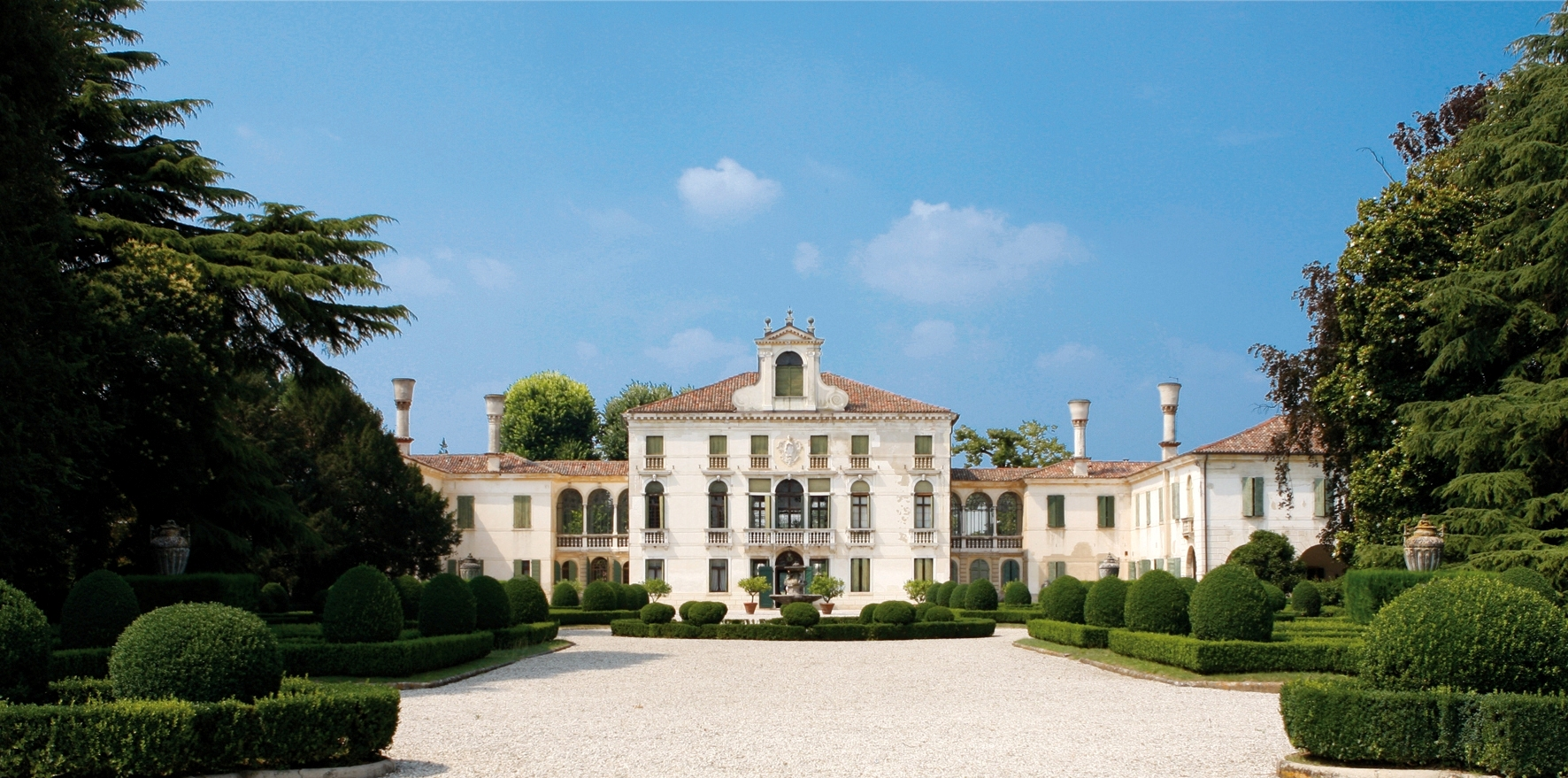
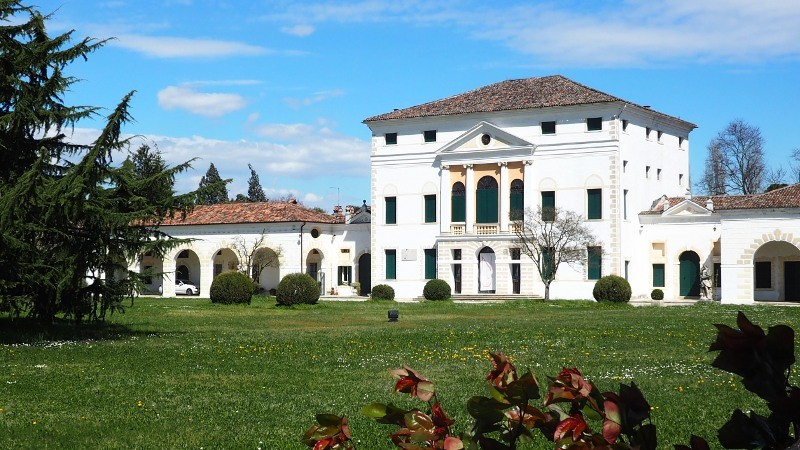
- Villa Tiepolo Passi Villa Loredan Valier Perocco di Meduna

- Location within Italy Location within Veneto
- Coordinates: 45°41′N 12°17′E
- Country: Italy
- Region: Veneto
- Province: Treviso (TV)
- Frazioni: Biban, Mignagola, Pezzan, San Giacomo di Musestrelle, Vascon

Government
  - Mayor: Gabriele Mattiuzzo

Area
  - Total: 19.88 km^{2} (7.68 sq mi)
- Elevation: 18 m (59 ft)

Population (31 March 2017)
  - Total: 11,196
  - Density: 563.2/km^{2} (1,459/sq mi)
- Demonym: Carboneresi
- Time zone: UTC+1 (CET)
  - Summer (DST): UTC+2 (CEST)
- Postal code: 31030
- Dialing code: 0422
- Patron saint: Assumption of Mary
- Saint day: 15 August
- Website: Official website

Carbonera (Italian: [karboˈnɛːra], Venetian: [kaɾboˈnɛɾa]) is a comune (municipality) with 11,196 inhabitants in the province of Treviso, Veneto, northern Italy. It borders the municipalities of Treviso, Villorba, Spresiano, Maserada sul Piave, Breda di Piave and San Biagio di Callalta. The municipality of Carbonera includes the following villages or frazioni: Mignagola, Pezzan, Biban, San Giacomo di Musestrelle and Vascon.

== Origin and history ==
=== Origin of name ===
The name Carbonera has several possible origins. Carbonera in Roman times meant marshy, peaty and woody land. At one time some parts of castle fortifications were said to be carboneras, where charcoal was stored by blacksmiths and for the weapons that were used in raids or assaults. Here there was a castle that gave the name to a ruler, with the nickname of Carbonera or Castel Benardo perhaps by those who erected it.

Carbonera could also have derived from the burning of wood to make charcoal. The Via Boschi (Woods) still exists today, where there are many trees. Also carboneras were the ditches along the city walls, so the name Carbonera could be linked to the proximity of the town to Treviso.

=== Ancient history ===
When the Veneto became part of the Roman empire, Roman roads were built and passed through the present-day municipality area. Via Claudia Augusta was a great military road that started in Altino (near Venice), continued to Musestre, passed the Callalta (crossing from south to north at Mignagola and Vascon), then continued to Spresiano, crossing the Piave between Nervesa and Susegana and continuing towards the north usque ad flumen Danuvium (up to the Danube river), for a length of 523 km. The road originally was used to transport supplies to the conquered lands towards the Alps. It was a military road; in fact, along the road, castles and defense towers were erected. Today there are some traces of the road remaining in Mignagola and Vascon. Locally, along this roadway is the castle of Vascon.

Also in the area is the Via Postumia, a famous Roman consular road. On this via, the Roman legions marched while the consuls and the soldiers passed by. It was used for military and political purposes, but its importance went further: it served to transit goods and traffic, thus uniting peoples and cultures, allowing the progress of the Roman civilization. Via Postumia left Genoa, passed through Piacenza, Cremona, Verona, Vicenza, Oderzo, Aquileia and continued towards the east. Given its importance, frequent watchtowers were set up and assigned to Roman settlers in the camps, so that they could also defend the road along with their properties. The surrounding countryside grew with villas (centers of agricultural production) around the castles and Vascon is an example. Treviso, which became a Roman municipality, built some connections with these roads as well.

Treviso was also connected with nearby Oderzo. The Via Ungaresca passed near Vascon for Catena and Lovadina towards the Piave, at the Grave of Papadopoli. It remained in use until the Napoleonic-era construction of the Ponte della Priula and Pontebbana. At the Palazzon pass, there is evidence that Alboin, king of the invading Lombards, met the Bishop of Treviso, Felice, which meeting spared the sacking of the countryside and the city. The Roman road Caltrevisana, which linked the streets of Lancenigo with the Via Postumia to Maserada, was built to hasten the route to Oderzo.

=== Recent history ===
Carbonera once included these four villages: Carbonera proper, Bibano, Il Castello and Mignagola. The first written history of Carbonera dates to the year 1000. In 1115 the Cluniac friars donated the monastery of St. James the Apostle. In a parchment paper written on March 21, 1121, Oderico di Carbonera witnessed a donation of land to the church of Santa Fosca di Treviso. The church of Carbonera was part of the bishop's episcopal of Treviso.

The old church of Carbonera was mentioned in 1217. It was a branch of the Pieve di S. Maria and San Giovanni Battista di Piovenzano and Lancenigo which, in turn, was part of the Archpriest of Quinto. The church was dedicated under the name Santa Maria Maggiore di Carbonera.

During the Middle Ages, the region of the Podesteria of Treviso called Zosagna di Sopra, was fortified and equipped with a castle that, conquered by Ezzelino III da Romano in the mid-thirteenth century, was immediately reoccupied by the Treviso and destroyed. After being among the possessions of various religious orders, such as the Certosini del Montello, the Dominicans, the Serviti and the Canons of the Trevigiano Chapter, it passed to the Venetian Republic, becoming one of the places chosen by the Venetian aristocracy for the construction of palatial living residences. The decline of the Serenissima followed the French and Austrian occupations and, in 1866, the annexation by the Kingdom of Italy.

In World War I, Carbonera was near the front line with the Austria-Hungary after the Battle of Caporetto. In that last year of the War, Carbonera became a rest area for Italian troops rotating back from the front lines at the Piave River. In 1918 the villa Tiepolo became Red Cross Military Hospital - city of Milan no.7. In 1943, due to World War II, the villa was abandoned by the family, who moved to Venice, because the house was first occupied by the military district then by a German anti-aircraft command, then used as the seat of the Prefecture and the Republican Police Headquarters of Treviso.

The massacre of the Mignagola paper mill (Strage della cartiera di Mignagola) was perpetrated by elements of the partisan Garibaldi Brigades between April and May 1945, in Mignagola, Carbonera. The Partisans killed numerous soldiers of the Italian Social Republic and fascist-supporting civilians. Eighty-three bodies were found hidden in the vicinity of the Mignagola paper mill, without taking into account those killed elsewhere or disposed in the river Sile.

== Geography and climate ==
Carbonera is located in the north-eastern part of the province of Treviso between the rivers Sile and Piave. The regional subsoil consists mainly of gravel banks and alluvial mixtures, coming from the periodic floods of the Piave. This river has a torrential character. The ancient and more recent floods gave rise to the gravel and mixed layer on which Carbonera was built; furthermore, the most recent floods contributed to forming the surface layer of medium-textured mixed soils of a clayey-sandy nature. The gravelly layer has great permeability and is affected by numerous artesian aquifers with generally excellent drinking water from which the population of the municipality draws the water necessary for civil and industrial uses.

The topography of the land of the municipality of Carbonera is essentially flat with relatively small differences in elevation. In addition to the network of small watercourses, the municipality of Carbonera is cut, along the boundaries of the properties or at the limits of cultivation, by ditches for collecting rainwater. The land is completely cultivated and is divided into properties or areas for small farms. The nature of the land and the presence of water ensure the success of many crops, as well as encouraging the growth of tall trees along the ditches and watercourses.

The municipality of Carbonera is crossed by the smaller rivers Melma, Piovensan, Rul, Mignagola, Nerbon, Pulise, Rio Bagnon, Musestre, Musestrelle, Rivo le Fontane, Rivo Ghirada, Rivo Scolo and the Peschiera. The paths of these rivers are short and straight and hidden by the vegetation of various kinds. Their waters are clear, however, when it rains, they increase in volume and become muddy. Many times there emerge patches of typical water vegetation.

As for the climate, the territory of Carbonera has the typical characteristics of the north-eastern area of the Po Valley with slight differences due to the relative proximity of the Adriatic Sea. The climate does not differ from the medium-temperate one, however, there are some particular notations: considerable humidity in autumn and in winter, the presence of fog banks.

== Attractions ==
- Villa Loredan Valier Perocco di Meduna
- Villa Gradenigo (now Pellegrini)
- Villa Passi (formerly Tiepolo)
- Villa Gitta Caccianiga
- Villa Maria (Pezzan)
- Villa Santina (Pezzan)
- S. Maria Assunta di Carbonera
- S. Lucia vergine e martire (Vascon)

== See also ==
- Grave di Papadopoli
- Ponte della Priula
- Strage della cartiera di Mignagola
- Villa Tiepolo Passi
