= Alvise Tagliapietra =

Italian sculptor (1670–1747)

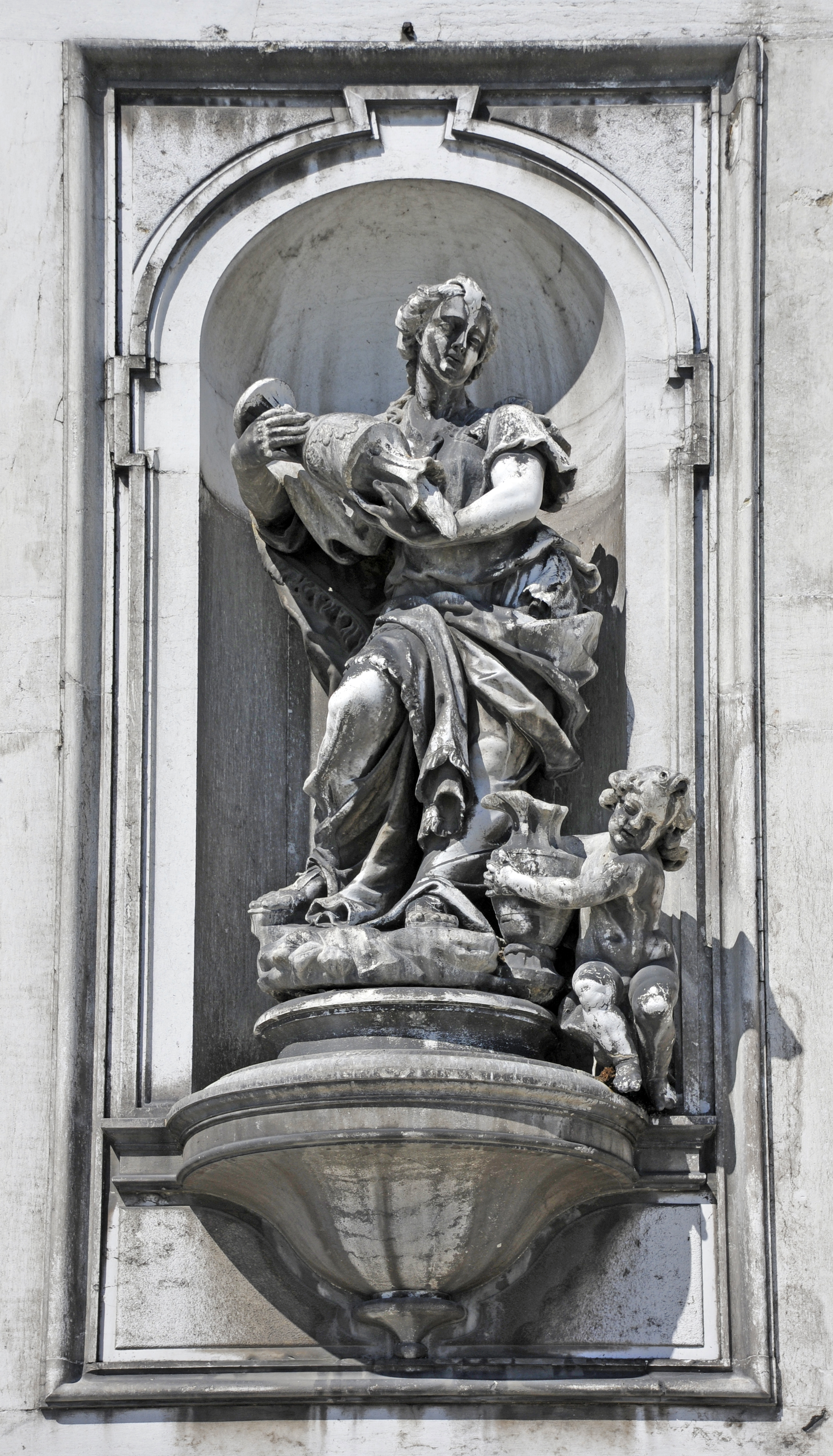
Tagliapietra's Temperance, facade of the Gesuati, Venice

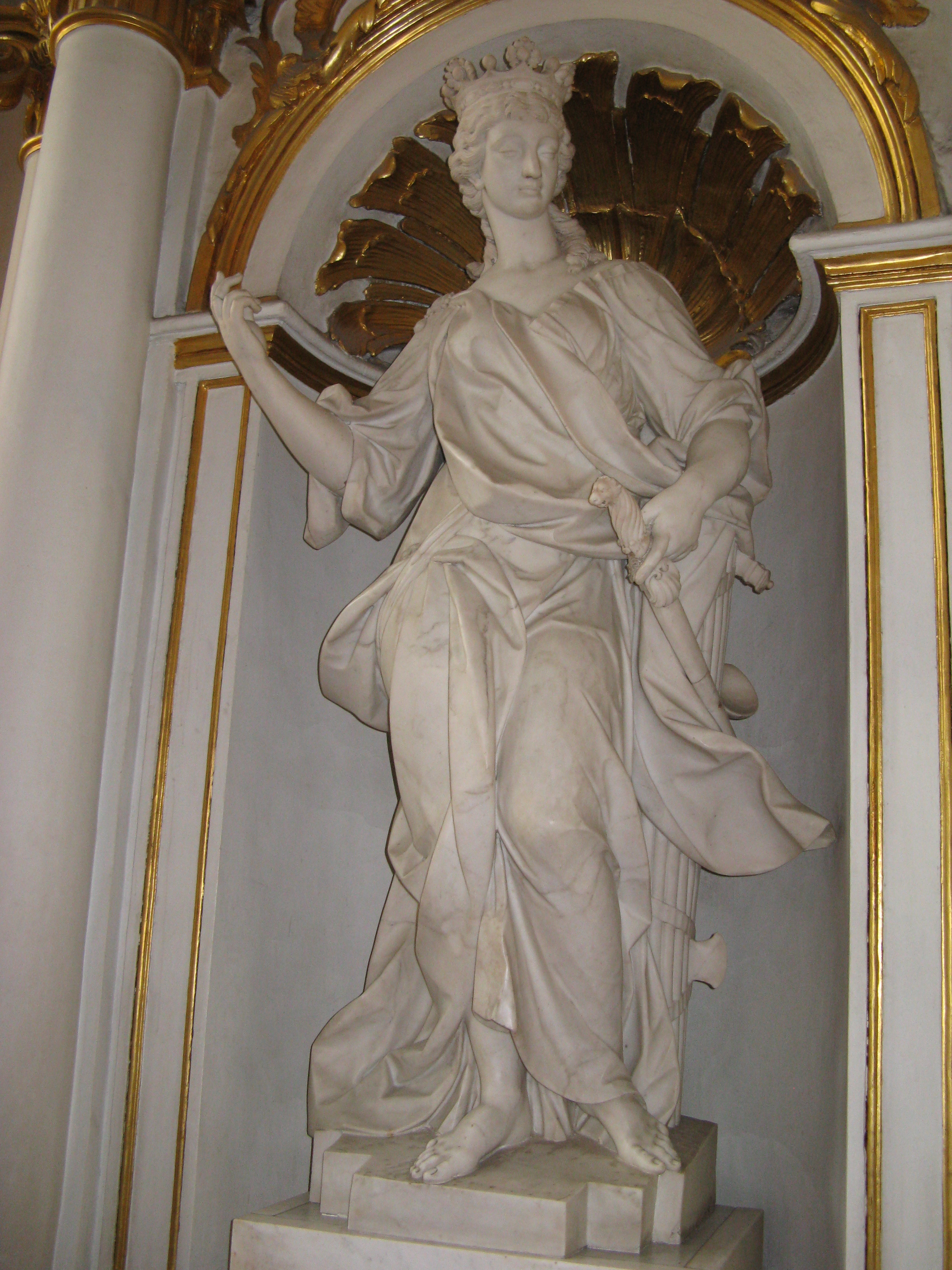
Tagliapietra's Justice, main staircase of the Winter Palace in the Hermitage

Alvise Tagliapietra (1670–1747) was a Venetian baroque sculptor.

== Life ==
Tagliapietra was born in Venice in 1670 and died there in 1747.

Between 1705 and 1711, he and his studio carved several standing marble figures for the high altar of the Church of Saint Chrysogonus in Zadar. John Julius Norwich writes of the statue of St. Simeon: "This figure's exaggerated contrapposto and exotic vestments make it a memorable statue." Shortly thereafter, Tagliapietra was one of several Italians commissioned to contribute sculptures to the Catherine Park at Tsarskoye Selo outside of St. Petersburg.

Another work attributed to Tagliapietra, but questioned by Norwich, is a Madonna of the Rosary in the Church of Saint Dominic in Split, Croatia.

He worked with his sons Ambrogio (b. 1701) and Giuseppe (b. 1711) on the Church of St. George and St. Euphemia in Rovinj, Istria, now in Croatia.

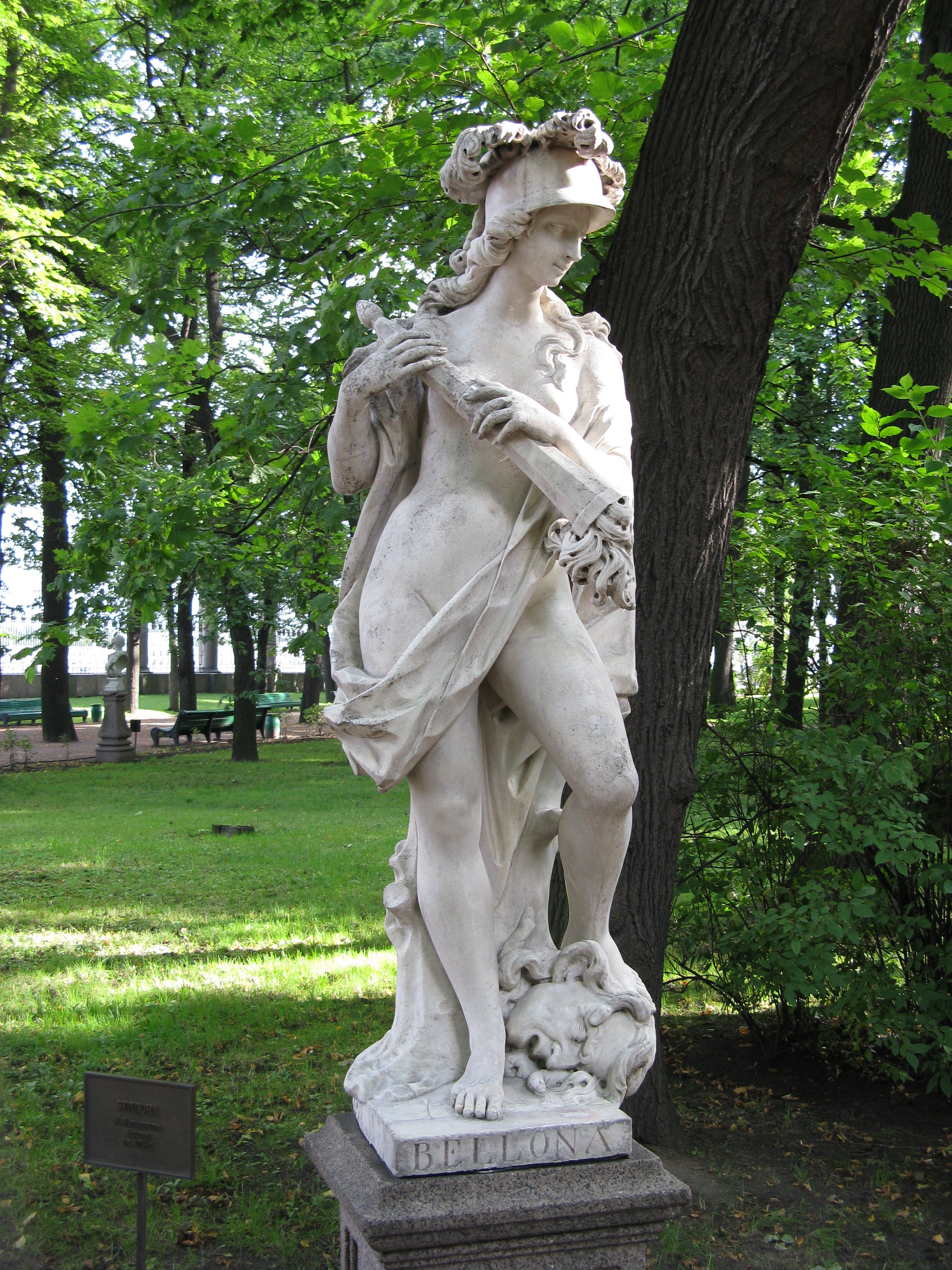
Tagliapietra's Bellona, the Summer Garden in Saint Petersburg

In his native Venice, his works include the statue of Temperance on the facade of the Gesuati, the baptistry and pulpit sculpted in 1732 for the Church of San Moisè, and the baptistry of the Oratorio of St. Martin in Chioggia. He also produced reliefs of the Visitation (1730) and the Presentation of Jesus in the Temple (1733–34) in the Chapel of the Rosary in the Basilica of Santi Giovanni e Paolo there.
