= Girolamo Brusaferro =

Italian painter

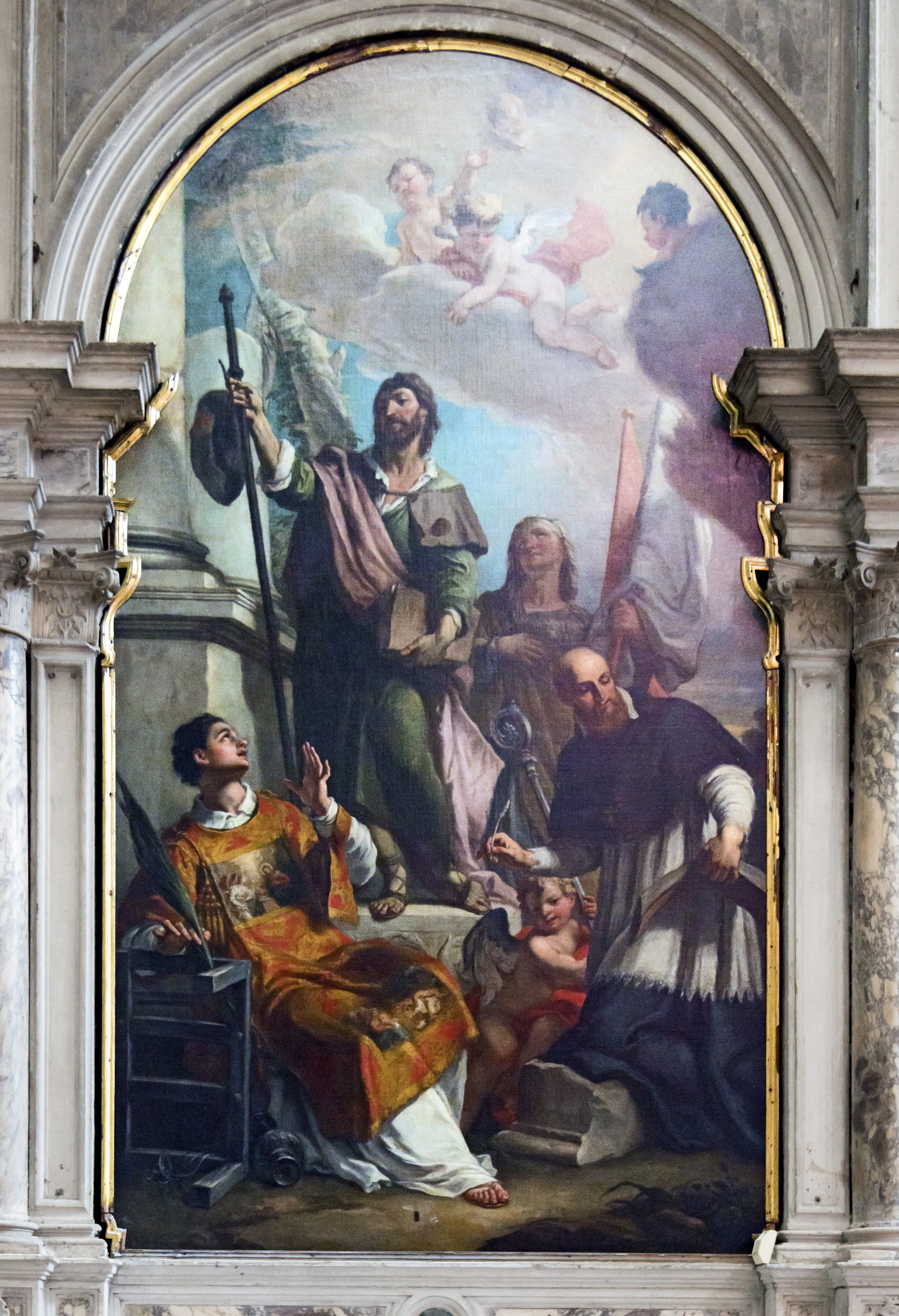
San Salvador, Venice. "The Apostle James between Saints Lawrence, Mary Magdalene and Francis de Sales"

Girolamo Brusaferro was an Italian painter of the 18th century, active in his native Venice. He was a pupil of Niccolò Bambini and Sebastiano Ricci. He has paintings in various churches in Venice including the Carmini. He collaborated by painting figures in the landscapes and backgrounds of Marini Antonio of Padua.
