= Fenouillet-Saint-Alban station =

Railway station in Saint-Alban, France

Fenouillet-Saint-Alban

General information
- Location: Fenouillet, Haute-Garonne; Occitanie, France
- Coordinates: 43°41′03″N 1°24′04″E
- Line: Bordeaux–Sète railway
- Platforms: 1
- Tracks: 4

Other information
- Station code: 87611962
Location
- Location within France Location within Europe

Fenouillet-Saint-Alban is a former railway station in Fenouillet, Occitanie, France. The station is on the Bordeaux–Sète railway. The station was served by TER (local) services operated by SNCF, between Montauban and Toulouse until 2016.
