= Anousone Prasitharath =

French-Laotian footballer and futsal player (born 1984)

Personal information
- Full name: Serge Anousoune Prasitharath
- Date of birth: 5 February 1984 (age 42)
- Place of birth: Luang Prabang, Laos
- Position: Forward

Youth career
- Toulouse FC

Senior career*
Years	Team	Apps	(Gls)
- Toulouse FC B
2005–2006	Louhans-Cuiseaux FC		
20xx–2009	US Colomiers Football		
2011–2012	Toulouse Rodéo FC		
2012–20xx	Bruguières SC Futsal		

International career
2012–2013	France (futsal)	2	
- * Club domestic league appearances and goals

Serge Anousoune Prasitharath (born 5 February 1984) is a French-Laotian former footballer and futsal player who last played for Bruguières SC Futsal and the France national futsal team. He has worked as a mechanic in Fenouillet.

== Career ==
=== Singapore ===
A member of Etoile's 18-man squad for the 2010 S.League, Prasitharath was unable to participate in the season as S.League regulations stipulate that players must pass a fitness test which he failed on all three attempts before leaving the club.

=== Futsal ===
In late 2012 and January 2013, Prasitharath was called up to represent the France national futsal team.

He has been described as having good technical abilities by Bruguières mentor Jean-Christophe Martinez.
