= Zenson di Piave =

- Comune
- Comune di Zenson di Piave
- Location within Italy Location within Veneto
- Coordinates: 45°41′N 12°30′E
- Country: Italy
- Region: Veneto
- Province: Province of Treviso (TV)

Area
  - Total: 9.5 km^{2} (3.7 sq mi)

Population (Dec. 2004)
  - Total: 1,771
  - Density: 190/km^{2} (480/sq mi)
- Time zone: UTC+1 (CET)
  - Summer (DST): UTC+2 (CEST)
- Postal code: 31050
- Dialing code: 0421
- Website: Official website

Zenson di Piave is a comune (municipality) in the Province of Treviso in the Italian region Veneto, located about 30 kilometres (19 mi) northeast of Venice and about 20 kilometres (12 mi) east of Treviso. As of 31 December 2004, it had a population of 1,771 and an area of 9.5 square kilometres (3.7 mi^{2}).

Zenson di Piave borders the following municipalities: Fossalta di Piave, Monastier di Treviso, Noventa di Piave, Salgareda, San Biagio di Callalta.

== Demographic evolution ==
Historical population

Year	Pop.	±%
1861	?	—
1871	1,666	—
1881	1,714	+2.9%
1901	1,753	+2.3%
1911	2,076	+18.4%

Year	Pop.	±%
1921	2,282	+9.9%
1931	2,430	+6.5%
1936	2,453	+0.9%
1951	2,427	−1.1%
1961	1,884	−22.4%

Year	Pop.	±%
1971	1,626	−13.7%
1981	1,572	−3.3%
1991	1,568	−0.3%
2001	1,694	+8.0%

Source: Data from ISTAT
