= Salgareda =

- Comune
- Comune di Salgareda
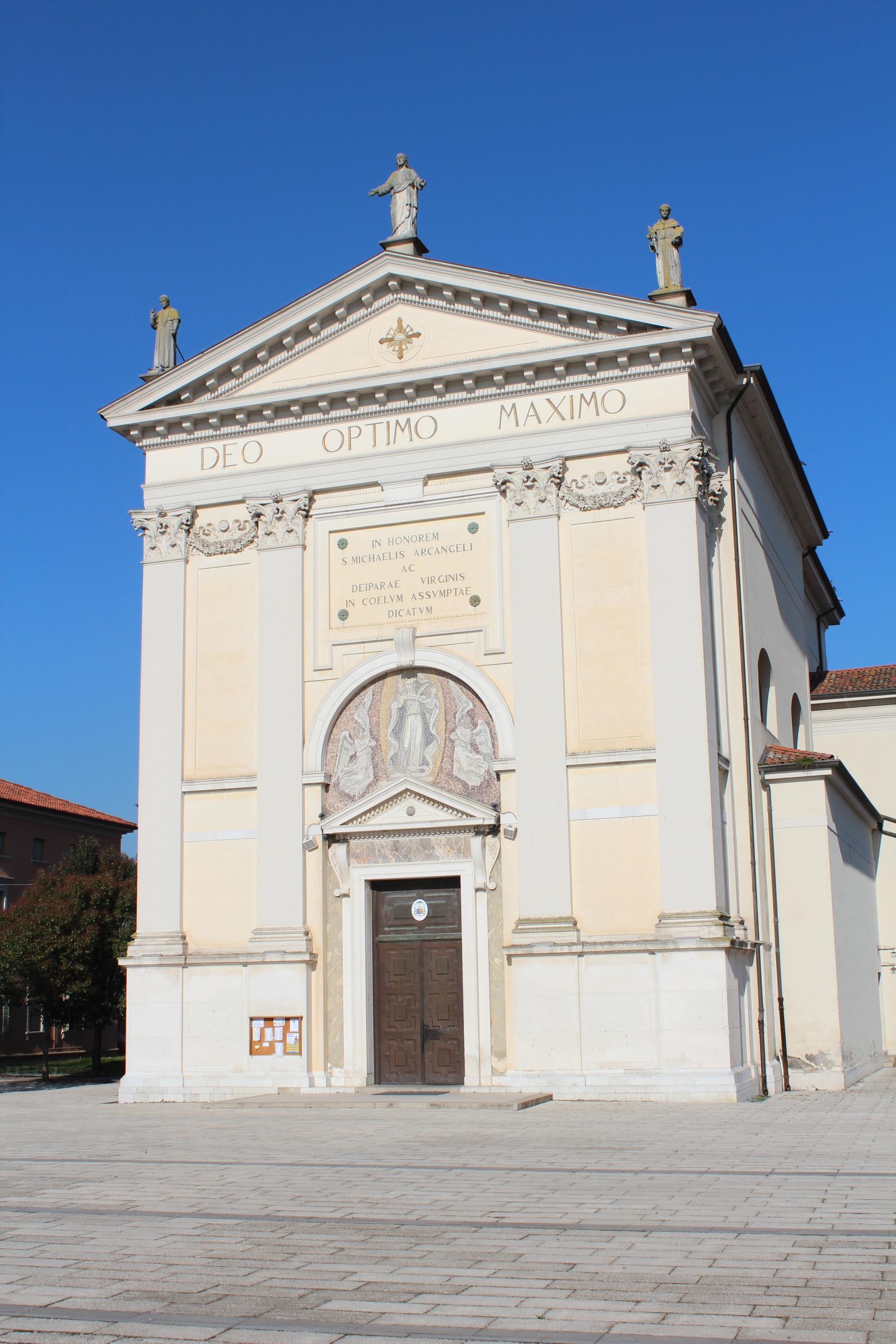
- Church of Saint Michael

- Location within Italy Location within Veneto
- Coordinates: 45°42′N 12°29′E
- Country: Italy
- Region: Veneto
- Province: Province of Treviso (TV)
- Frazioni: Campodipietra, Campobernardo, Arzeri e Candolè (solo località riconosciute)

Government
  - Mayor: Vito Messina

Area
  - Total: 27.2 km^{2} (10.5 sq mi)
- Elevation: 8 m (26 ft)

Population (December 2004)
  - Total: 6,102
  - Density: 224/km^{2} (581/sq mi)
- Time zone: UTC+1 (CET)
  - Summer (DST): UTC+2 (CEST)
- Postal code: 31040
- Dialing code: 0422
- Patron saint: St. Michele Arcangelo
- Saint day: 29 September
- Website: Official website

Salgareda is a comune (municipality) in the Province of Treviso in the Italian region Veneto, located about 30 kilometres (19 mi) northeast of Venice and about 20 kilometres (12 mi) east of Treviso. As of 31 December 2004, it had a population of 6,102 and an area of 27.2 square kilometres (10.5 mi^{2}).

The municipality of Salgareda contains the frazioni (subdivisions, mainly villages and hamlets) Campodipietra, Campobernardo, and Arzeri e Candolè (solo località riconosciute).

Salgareda borders the following municipalities: Cessalto, Chiarano, Noventa di Piave, San Biagio di Callalta, San Donà di Piave, Ponte di Piave, Zenson di Piave.

== Demographic evolution ==
Historical population

Year	Pop.	±%
1861	?	—
1871	3,552	—
1881	3,687	+3.8%
1901	4,054	+10.0%
1911	4,925	+21.5%

Year	Pop.	±%
1921	5,180	+5.2%
1931	6,205	+19.8%
1936	6,165	−0.6%
1951	6,137	−0.5%
1961	4,597	−25.1%

Year	Pop.	±%
1971	4,204	−8.5%
1981	4,524	+7.6%
1991	4,634	+2.4%
2001	5,574	+20.3%

Source: Data from ISTAT

== Twin towns ==
Salgareda is twinned with:

- Saint-Alban, Haute-Garonne, France, since 1989
- Brzeziny, Poland, since 2010
