= Saint-Alban, Haute-Garonne =

Saint-Alban
- Commune
- Coat of arms
- Location of Saint-Alban
- Location within France Location within Occitanie
- Coordinates: 43°41′34″N 1°24′56″E
- Country: France
- Region: Occitania
- Department: Haute-Garonne
- Arrondissement: Toulouse
- Canton: Castelginest
- Intercommunality: Toulouse Métropole

Government
  - Mayor (2020–2026): Alain Susigan
- Area^{1}: 4.26 km^{2} (1.64 sq mi)
- Elevation: 129 m (423 ft)
- Highest elevation: 133 m (436 ft)
- Lowest elevation: 121 m (397 ft)
- Population (2023): 6,534
  - Density: 1,530/km^{2} (3,970/sq mi)
- Time zone: UTC+01:00 (CET)
  - Summer (DST): UTC+02:00 (CEST)
- INSEE/Postal code: 31467 /31140
- ^{1} French Land Register data, which excludes lakes, ponds, glaciers > 1 km^{2} (0.386 sq mi or 247 acres) and river estuaries.

Saint-Alban (French pronunciation: [sɛ̃.t‿albɑ̃]; Occitan: Sent Alban) is a commune in the Haute-Garonne department in southwestern France.

== Population ==
Historical population
Year	Pop.	±% p.a.
1968	1,749	—
1975	2,258	+3.72%
1982	2,792	+3.08%
1990	4,417	+5.90%
1999	5,186	+1.80%
2007	5,516	+0.77%
2012	5,777	+0.93%
2017	6,150	+1.26%
2023	6,534	+1.01%
Source: INSEE

== Twin towns ==
Saint-Alban is twinned with:

- Salgareda, Italy, since 1989
- Brzeziny, Poland, since 2010

== See also ==
- Communes of the Haute-Garonne department
