= Gratentour =

- Commune
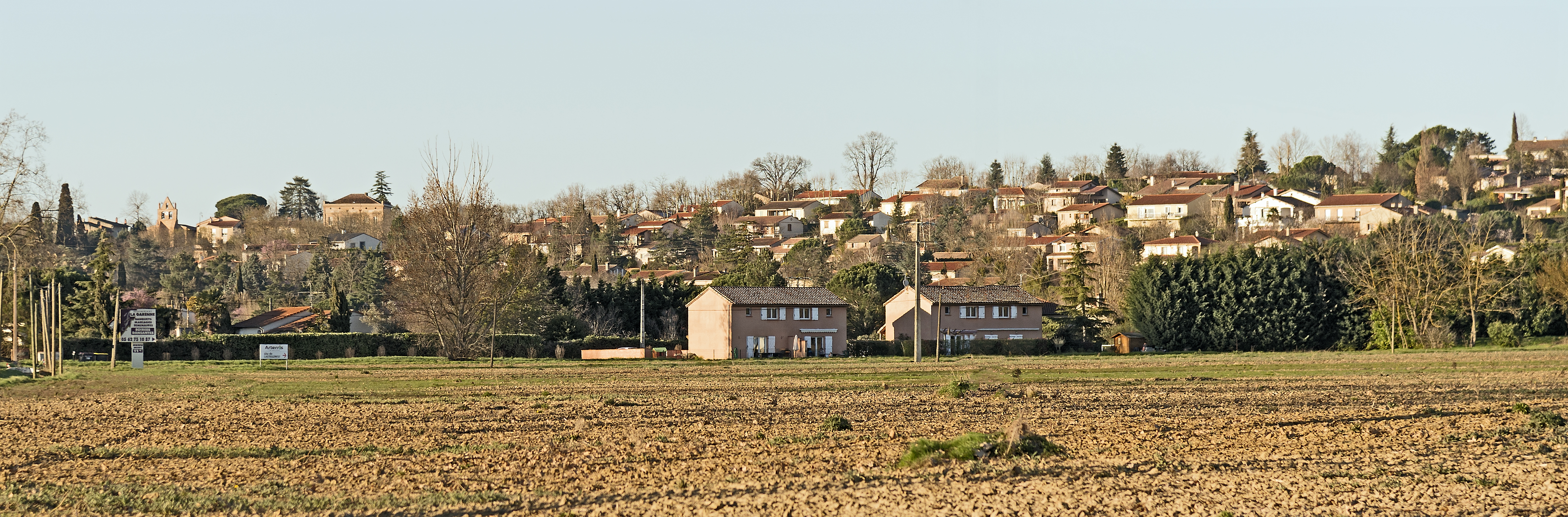
- A general view of Gratentour

- Coat of arms
- Location of Gratentour
- Location within France Location within Occitanie
- Coordinates: 43°43′19″N 1°25′56″E
- Country: France
- Region: Occitania
- Department: Haute-Garonne
- Arrondissement: Toulouse
- Canton: Castelginest
- Intercommunality: Toulouse Métropole

Government
  - Mayor (2020–2026): Patrick Delpech
- Area^{1}: 4.09 km^{2} (1.58 sq mi)
- Elevation: 170 m (560 ft)
- Highest elevation: 194 m (636 ft)
- Lowest elevation: 123 m (404 ft)
- Population (2023): 4,906
  - Density: 1,200/km^{2} (3,110/sq mi)
- Time zone: UTC+01:00 (CET)
  - Summer (DST): UTC+02:00 (CEST)
- INSEE/Postal code: 31230 /31150
- ^{1} French Land Register data, which excludes lakes, ponds, glaciers > 1 km^{2} (0.386 sq mi or 247 acres) and river estuaries.

Gratentour (French pronunciation: [ɡʁatɛ̃tuʁ]; Occitan: Gratentorn) is a commune in the Haute-Garonne department in southwestern France.

== Population ==
Historical population
Year	Pop.	±% p.a.
1968	646	—
1975	924	+5.25%
1982	1,574	+7.91%
1990	2,518	+6.05%
1999	3,035	+2.10%
2007	3,662	+2.38%
2012	3,552	−0.61%
2017	4,158	+3.20%
2023	4,906	+2.80%
Source: INSEE

== Monument ==
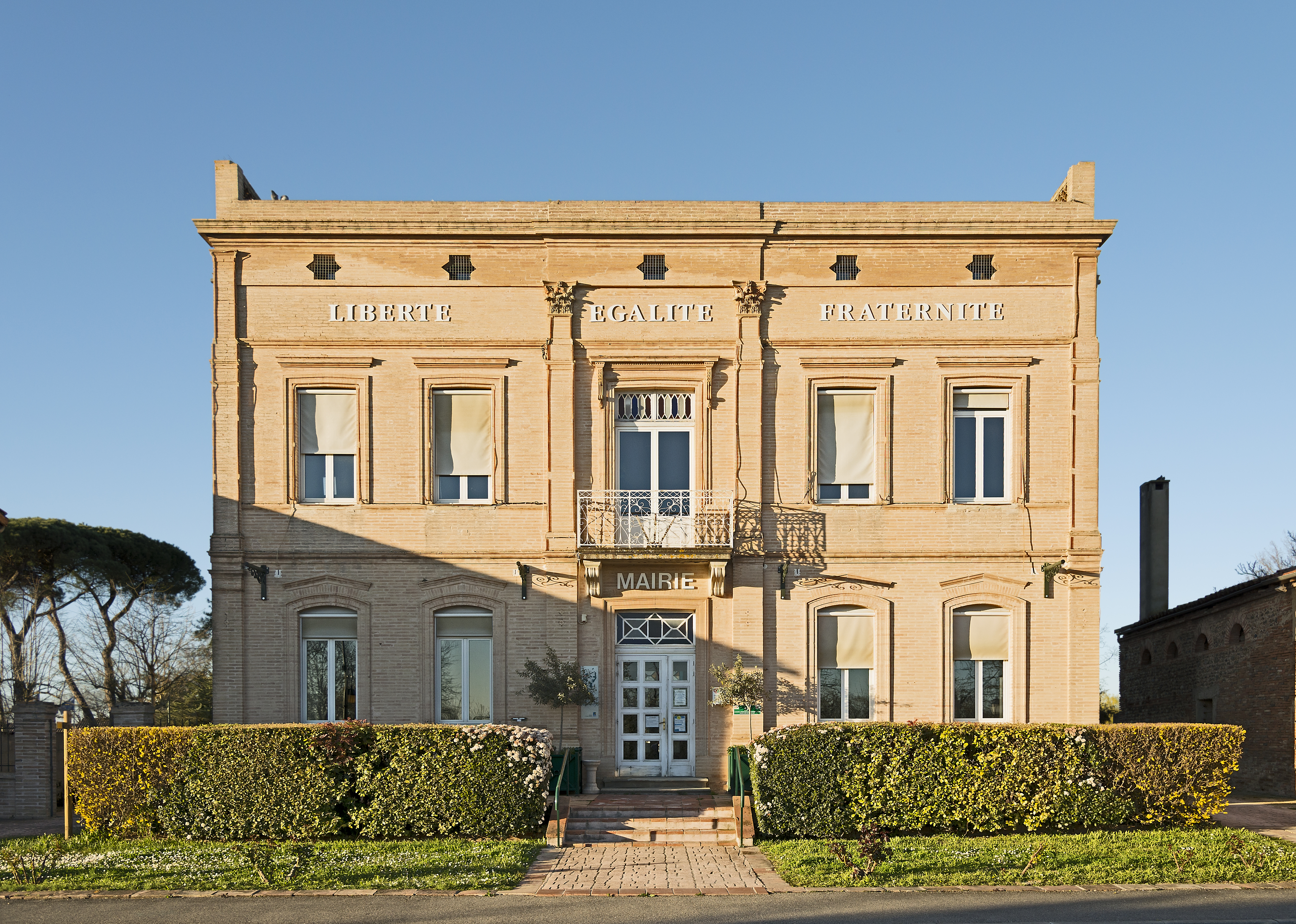
Town hall

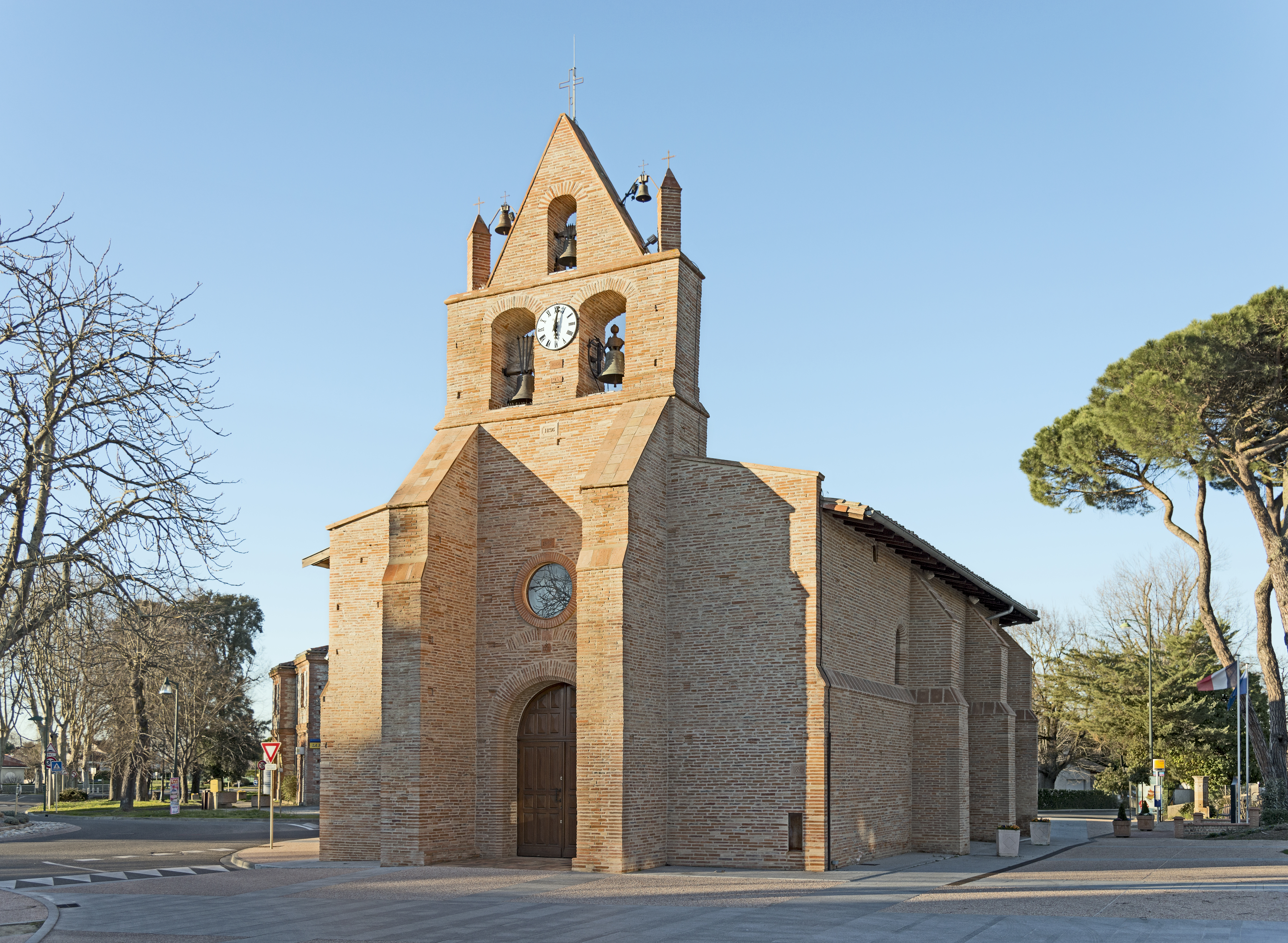
Sainte Quitterie church

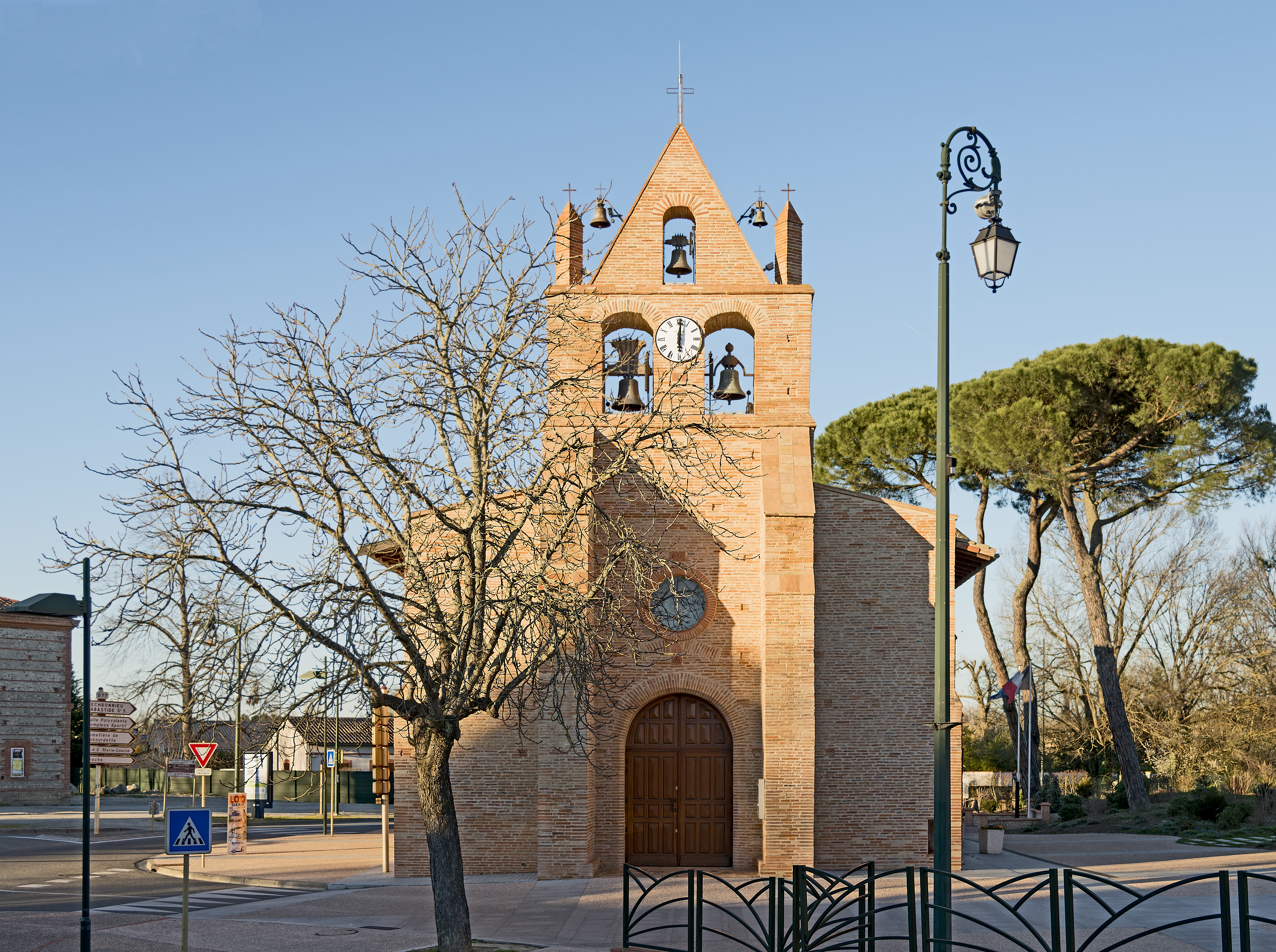
Bell gabel of Sainte Quitterie church

== See also ==
- Communes of the Haute-Garonne department
