= Brzeziny, Brzeziny County =

Brzeziny
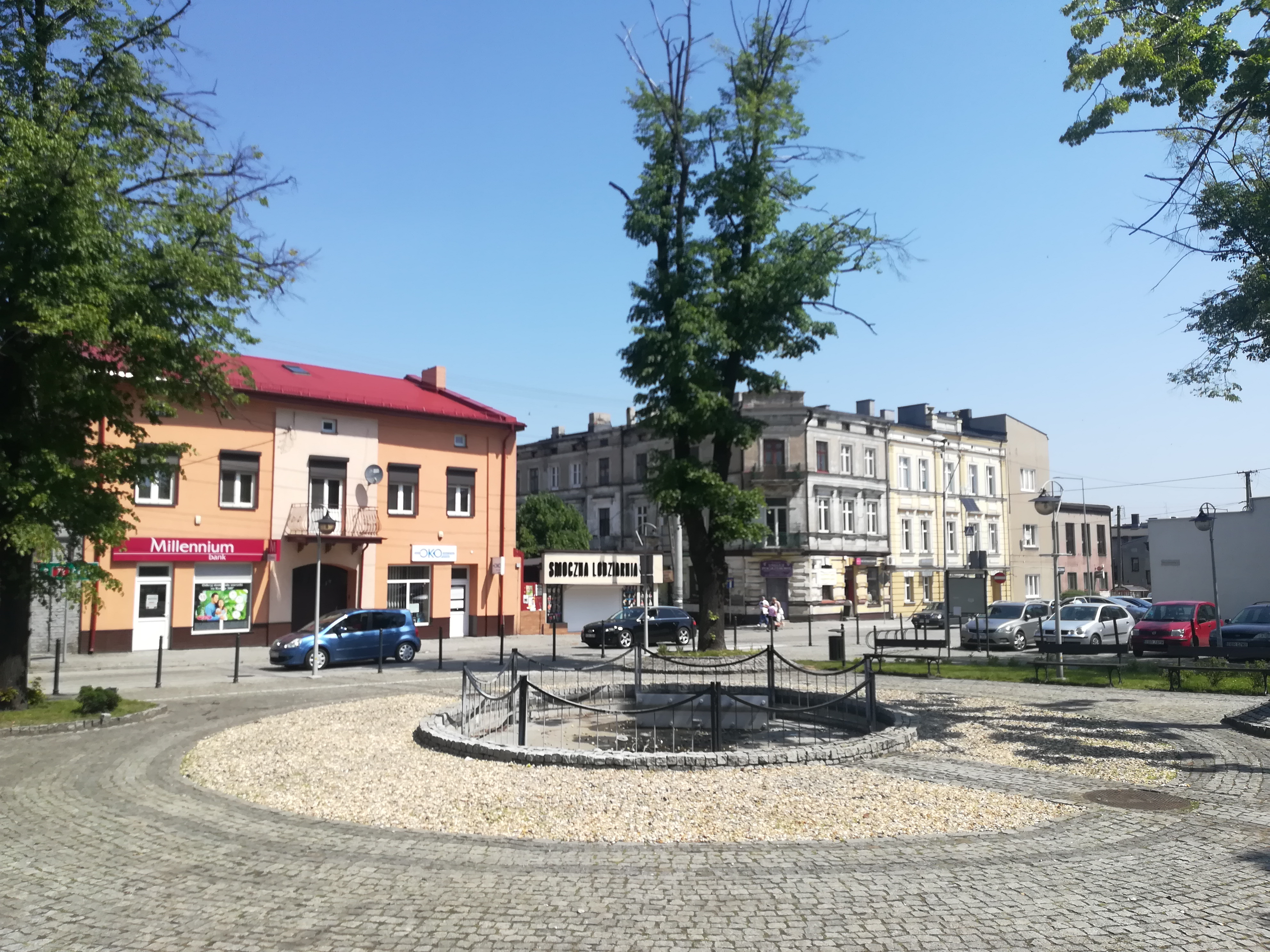
- Market Square

- Flag Coat of arms

- Location within Poland
- Coordinates: 51°48′N 19°45′E
- Country: Poland
- Voivodeship: Łódź
- County: Brzeziny
- Gmina: Brzeziny (urban gmina)

Government
  - Mayor: Ilona Skipor

Area
  - Total: 29.58 km^{2} (11.42 sq mi)

Population (31 December 2021)
  - Total: 12,326
  - Density: 416.7/km^{2} (1,079/sq mi)
- Time zone: UTC+1 (CET)
  - Summer (DST): UTC+2 (CEST)
- Postal code: 95-060
- Car plates: ELW (to 2002); EBR (since 2002)
- Website: http://www.brzeziny.pl

Brzeziny ([bʐɛˈʑinɨ]; Yiddish: ברעזין, Brezin) is a town in central Poland, in Łódź Voivodeship, about 20 km (12 mi) east of Łódź. It is the capital of Brzeziny County and has a population of 12,326 as of December 2021. It is situated on the Mrożyca River within the historic Łęczyca Land.

== History ==
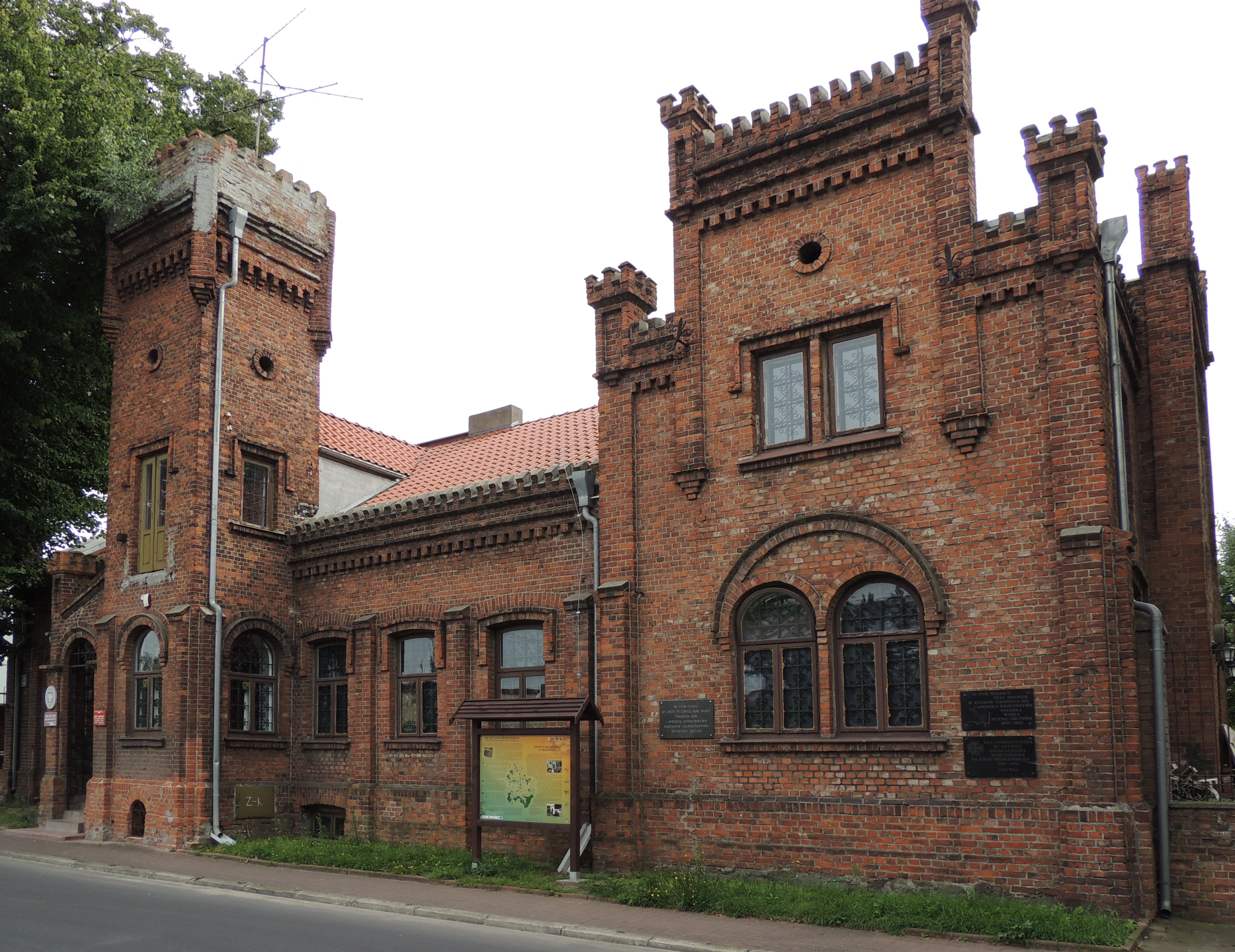
Regional Museum

Brzeziny dates back to the 13th century. The first documentary evidence of the town charter dates from 1332. The town played an important role in the development of trade between the Polish city of Toruń and Ruthenia from the 15th to 17th centuries. Of particular economic importance was craft and tailoring. Brzeziny was a county seat and private town within the Łęczyca Voivodeship in the Greater Poland Province of the Kingdom of Poland.

Brzeziny had one of the oldest Jewish communities in Poland, and was known as Krakówek ("Little Kraków"). Polish noblewoman Anna Łasocka brought the first Jewish weavers to Brzeziny, and in 1547 was the first reference to a Jewish population. The town was noted for its Jewish tailors. In the 17th century, there was also a sizeable Scottish community in Brzeziny.

In 1793, following the Second Partition of Poland, the town and region was annexed into the Kingdom of Prussia as South Prussia. In July 1807, following the Treaty of Tilsit, the town was transferred to the short-lived Polish Duchy of Warsaw and after June 1815, became part of the Russian-controlled Congress Poland to 1916. During World War I Austrian and German armies were very active in the region. The German General Karl Litzmann won an important battle here against the Russian army and earned the nickname "the lion of Brzeziny". From November 1916, with Poland mostly occupied by Austrian and German armies, the autonomous Regency Kingdom of Poland (Królestwo Regencyjne) governed the area until the declaration of the Second Polish Republic in 1918.

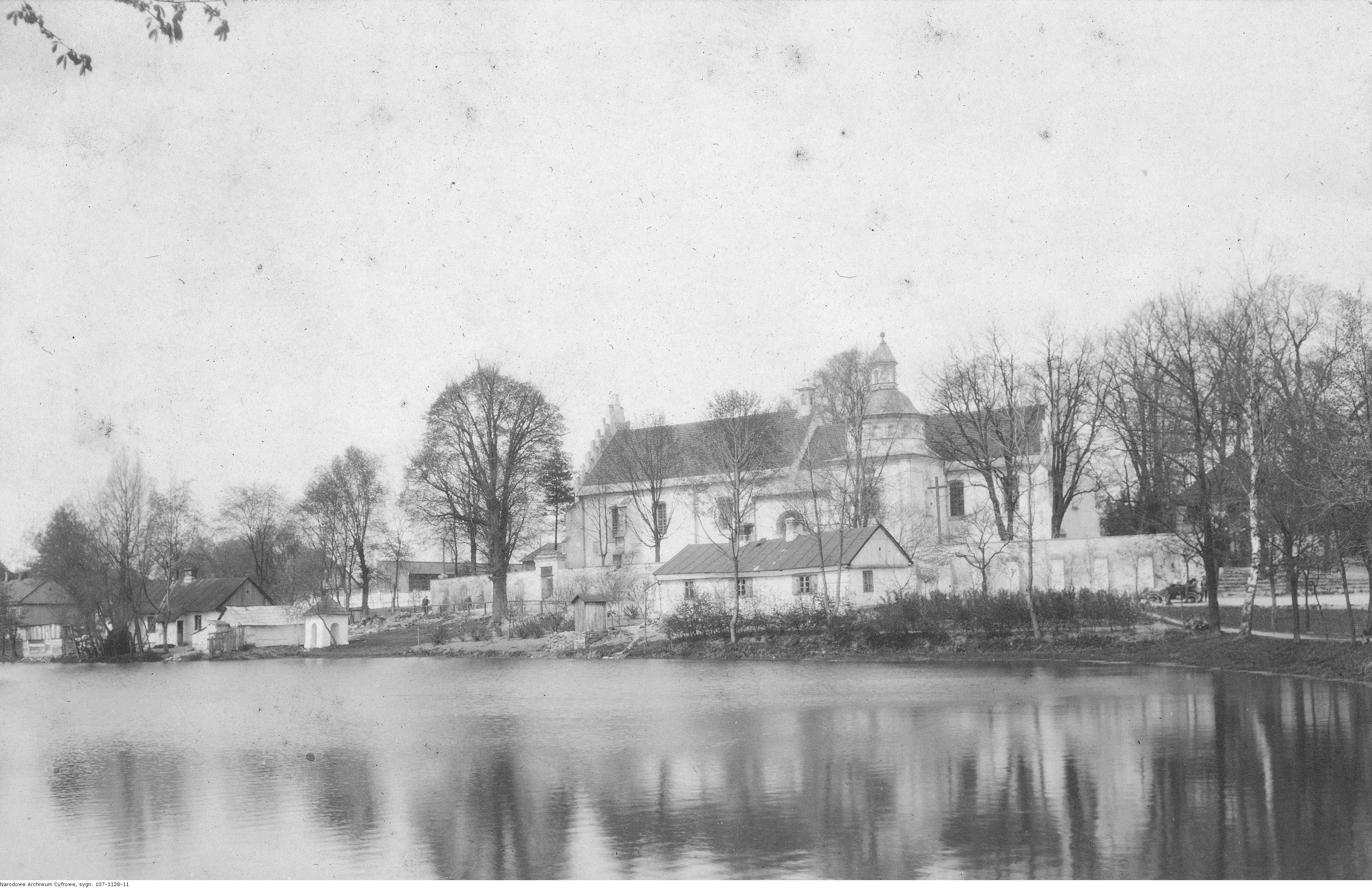
View of Brzeziny from the Mrożyca River in 1916

Beginning in 1939 and the German occupation of Poland in World War II the entire region was part of the notorious Reichsgau Wartheland governed by SS Obergruppenfuhrer Arthur Greiser. The town was renamed Löwenstadt to honour Karl Litzmann. A ghetto was established in early 1940 and about 6,000 Brzeziny Jews were imprisoned there. Many died there of starvation, disease, and murder by the Germans. Some Poles tried to help by smuggling food into the ghetto. In 1942, hundreds of elderly, sick, and mothers with children were sent to the Chełmno extermination camp and were immediately gassed. Others were deported to the Lodz ghetto where most died or were sent to Auschwitz later. About 200 to 300 of the 6,850 Jews living in Brzeziny at the beginning of the war survived.

On 18 January 1945 the Red Army reached Brzeziny.

== Demographics ==
Historical population

Year	Pop.	±%
1890	6,993	—
1897	7,648	+9.4%
1921	10,633	+39.0%
1931	13,045	+22.7%
1939	14,000	+7.3%

Year	Pop.	±%
1950	6,369	−54.5%
1960	7,629	+19.8%
2010	12,309	+61.3%
2021	12,326	+0.1%

== Twin towns ==
Brzeziny is twinned with:

- Saint-Alban, Haute-Garonne, France, since 2010
- Salgareda, Italy, since 2010

== Notable residents ==
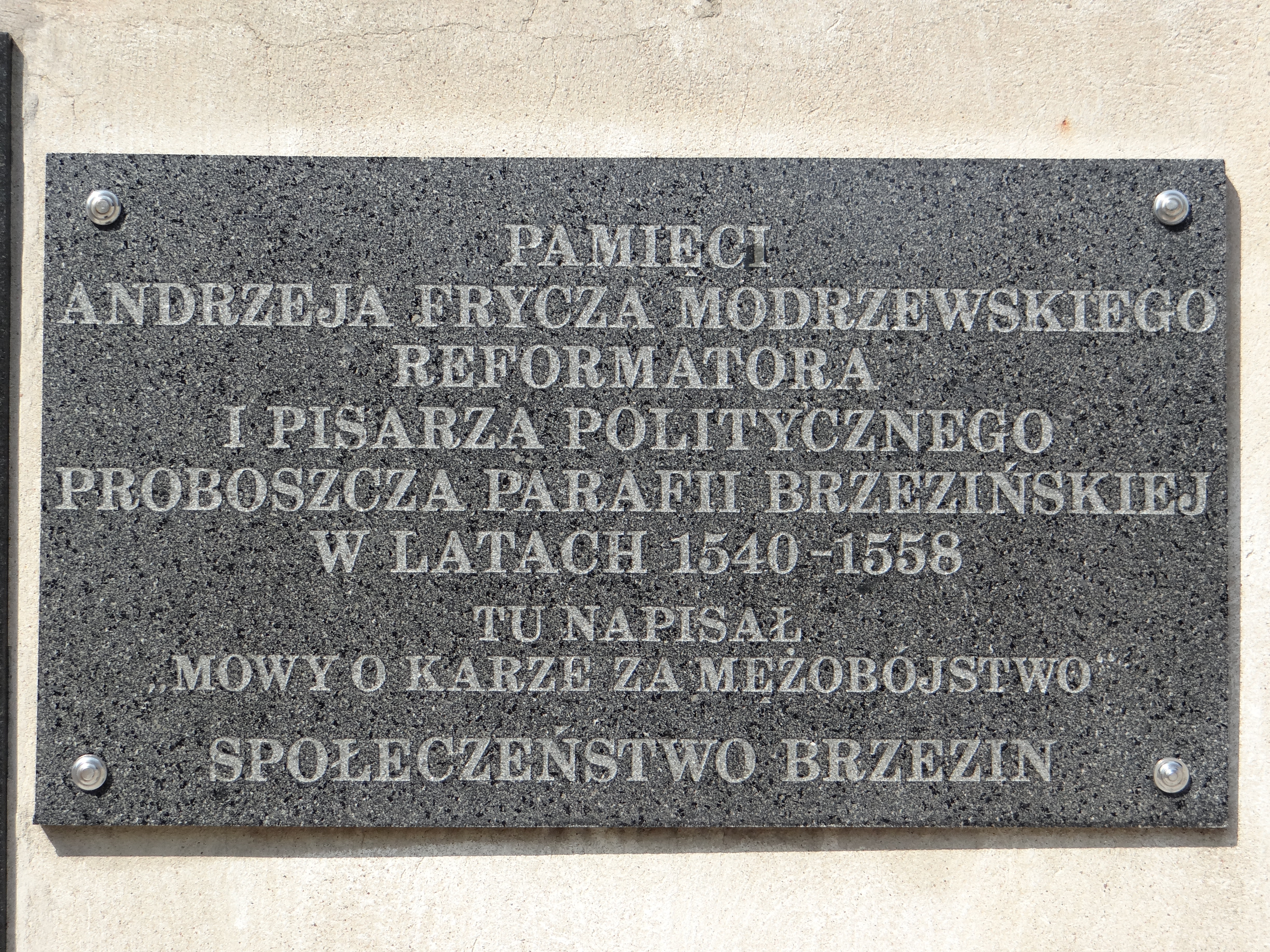
Memorial plaque to Andrzej Frycz Modrzewski

- Andrzej Frycz Modrzewski (1503-1572), Polish Renaissance scholar, humanist and theologian, called "the father of Polish democracy."
- Grzegorz Paweł z Brzezin (ca. 1525-1591), Socinian writer and theologian
- Adam Burski (ca. 1560–1611), Polish philosopher
- Abraham Icek Tuschinski (1886-1942), businessman
- Georg Wannagat (1916-2006), jurist
- Zbigniew Zamachowski (1961-), Polish actor
