= Canton of Castelginest =

Coordinates: 43.69°N 1.43°E

The canton of Castelginest is an administrative division of the Haute-Garonne department, southern France. It was created at the French canton reorganisation which came into effect in March 2015. Its seat is in Castelginest.

It consists of the following communes:

1. Aucamville
2. Bruguières
3. Castelginest
4. Fenouillet
5. Fonbeauzard
6. Gagnac-sur-Garonne
7. Gratentour
8. Lespinasse
9. Saint-Alban
10. Saint-Jory
