= Castelginest =

- Commune
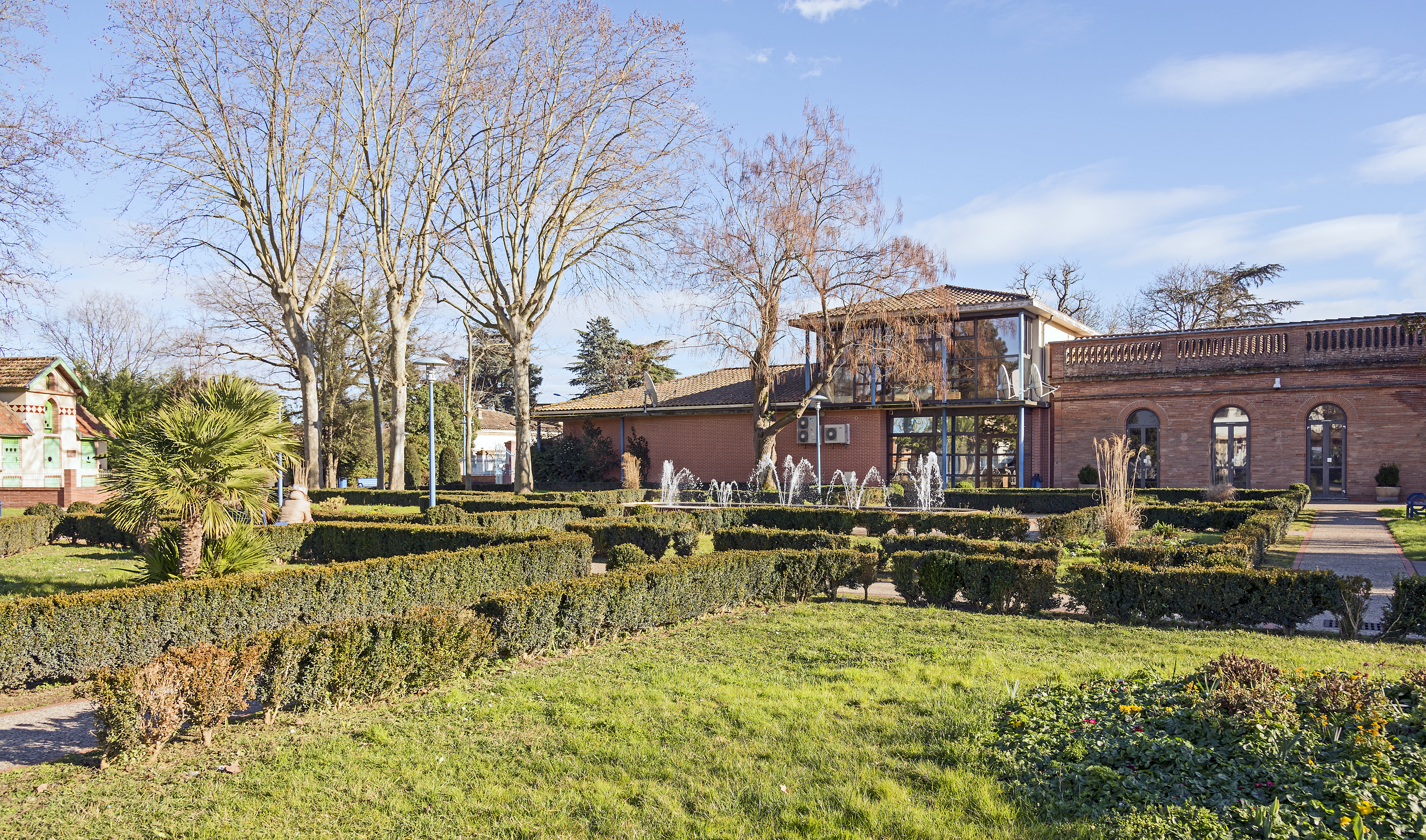
- The Mauvezin park in Castelginest

- Coat of arms
- Location of Castelginest
- Location within France Location within Occitanie
- Coordinates: 43°41′41″N 1°26′01″E
- Country: France
- Region: Occitania
- Department: Haute-Garonne
- Arrondissement: Toulouse
- Canton: Castelginest
- Intercommunality: Toulouse Métropole

Government
  - Mayor (2020–2026): Grégoire Carneiro
- Area^{1}: 8.11 km^{2} (3.13 sq mi)
- Elevation: 115 m (377 ft)
- Highest elevation: 193 m (633 ft)
- Lowest elevation: 122 m (400 ft)
- Population (2023): 11,271
  - Density: 1,390/km^{2} (3,600/sq mi)
- Time zone: UTC+01:00 (CET)
  - Summer (DST): UTC+02:00 (CEST)
- INSEE/Postal code: 31116 /31780
- ^{1} French Land Register data, which excludes lakes, ponds, glaciers > 1 km^{2} (0.386 sq mi or 247 acres) and river estuaries.

Castelginest (French pronunciation: [kastɛlʒinɛst]; Languedocien: Castèlginèst) is a commune in the Haute-Garonne department in southwestern France.

== Population ==
Historical population
Year	Pop.	±% p.a.
1968	1,412	—
1975	3,846	+15.39%
1982	5,349	+4.83%
1990	6,757	+2.96%
1999	7,735	+1.51%
2007	8,493	+1.18%
2012	9,369	+1.98%
2017	10,467	+2.24%
2023	11,271	+1.24%
Source: INSEE

== International relations ==
Castelginest is twinned with Ponte di Piave, Italy.

== Sights ==
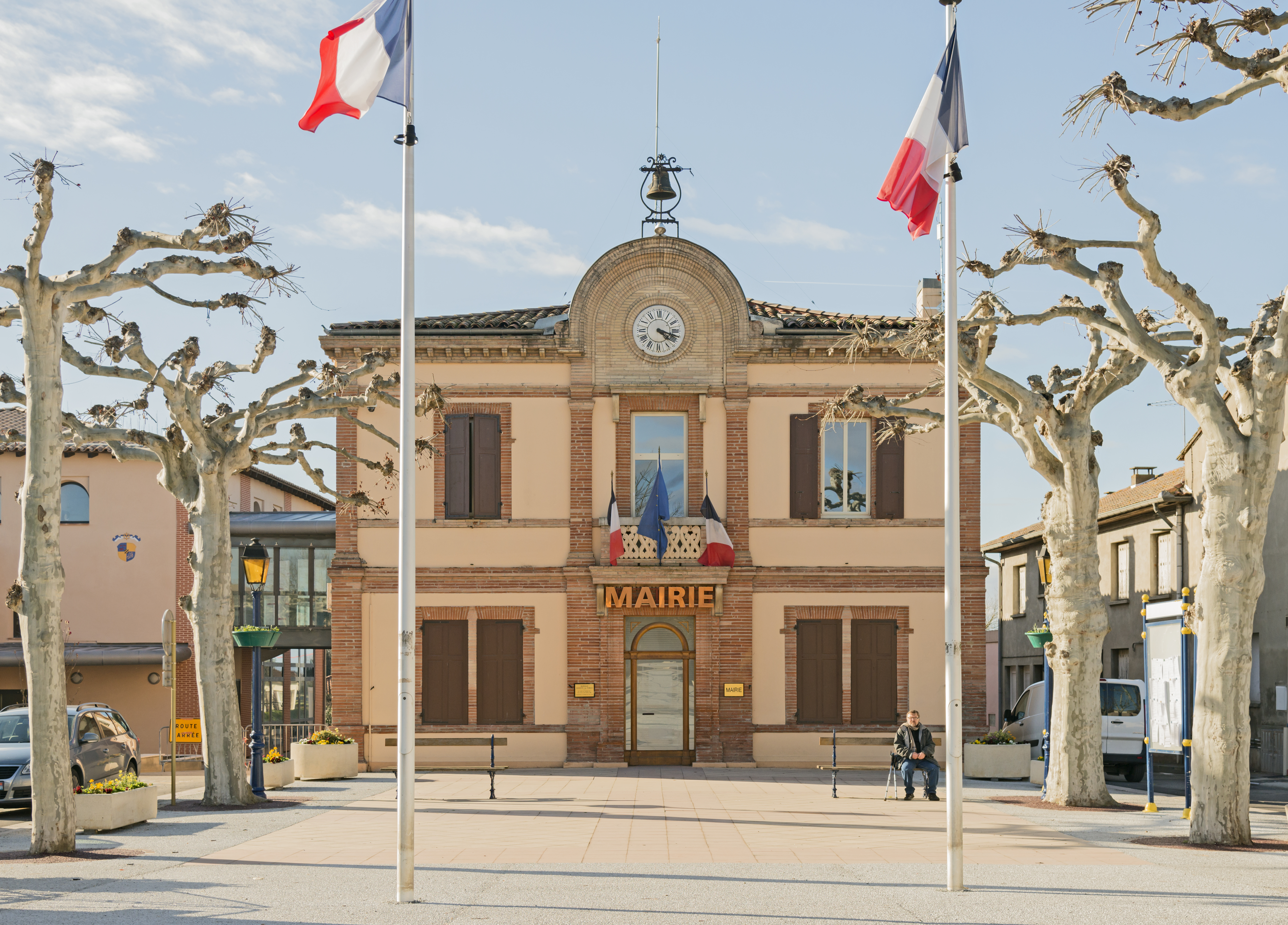
Town hall

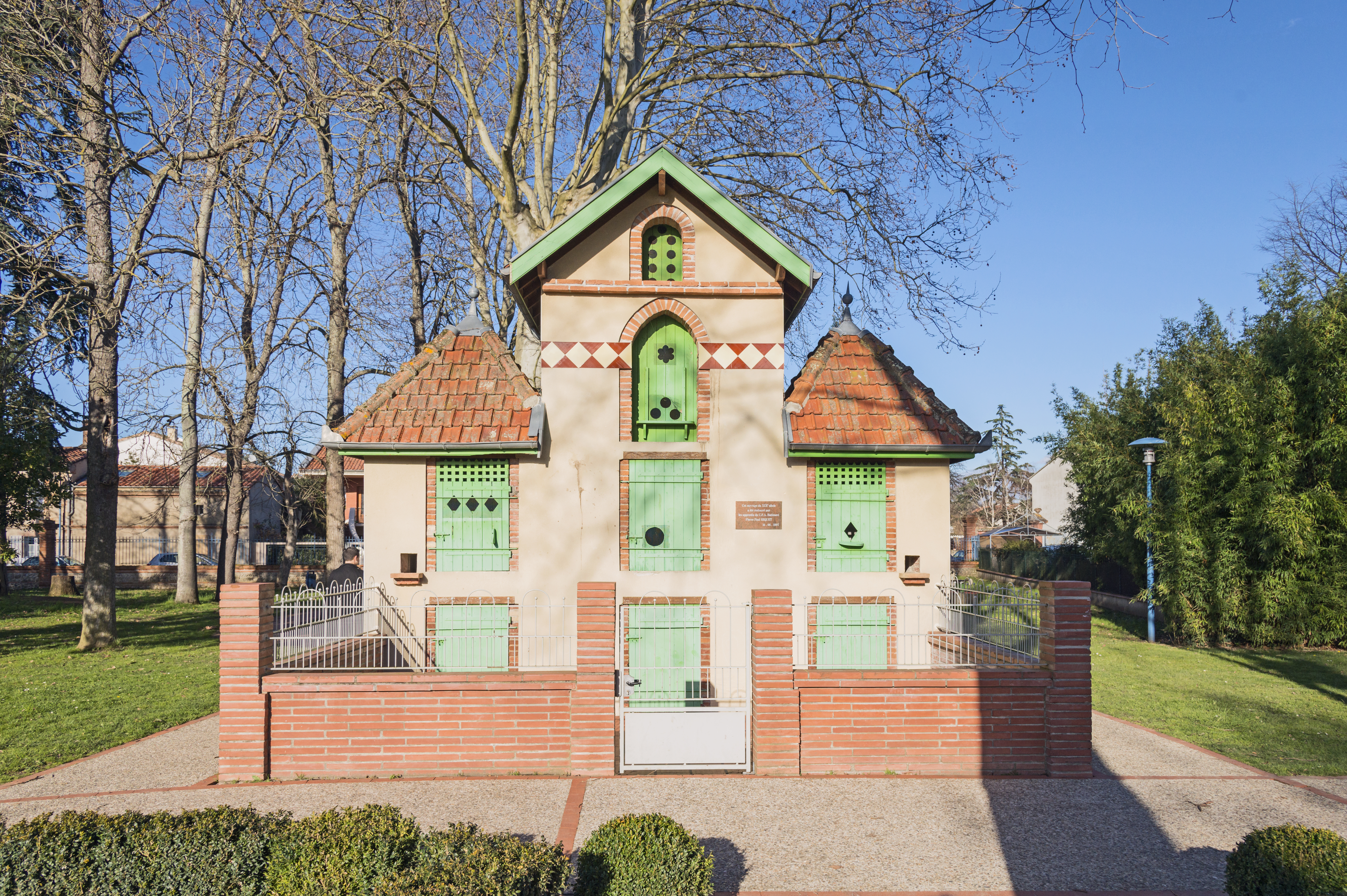
Dovecote

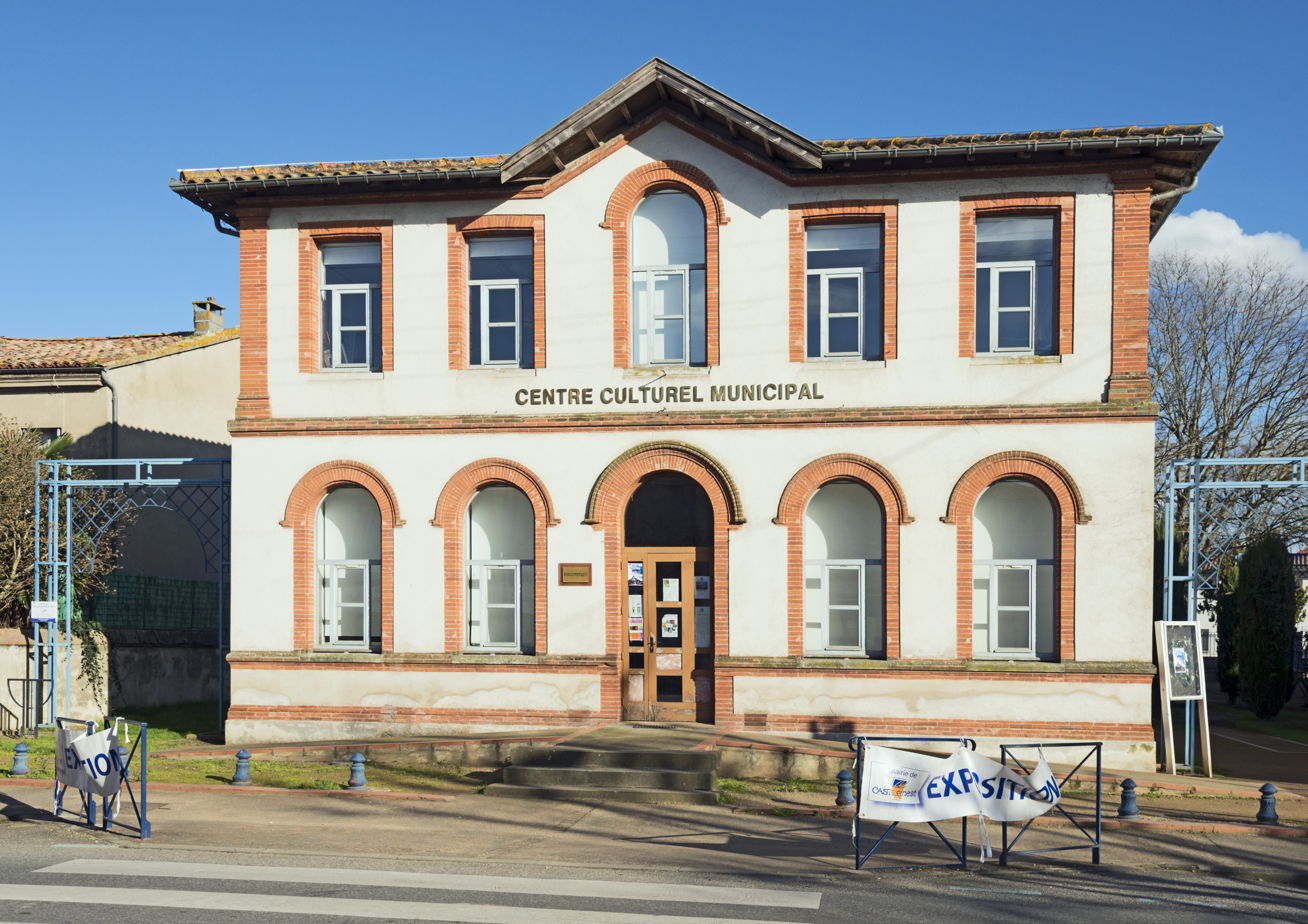
Municipal cultural center

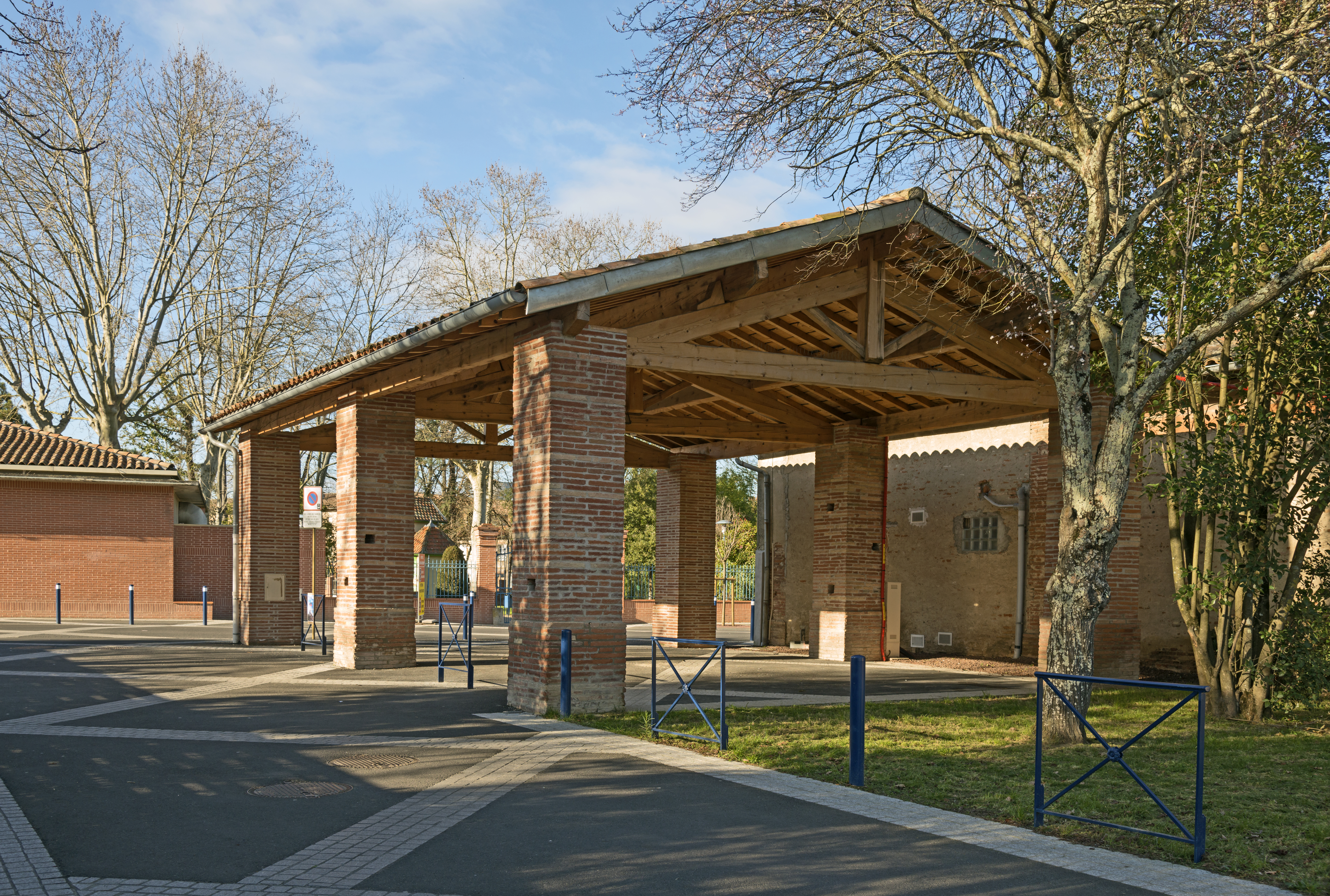
Market hall

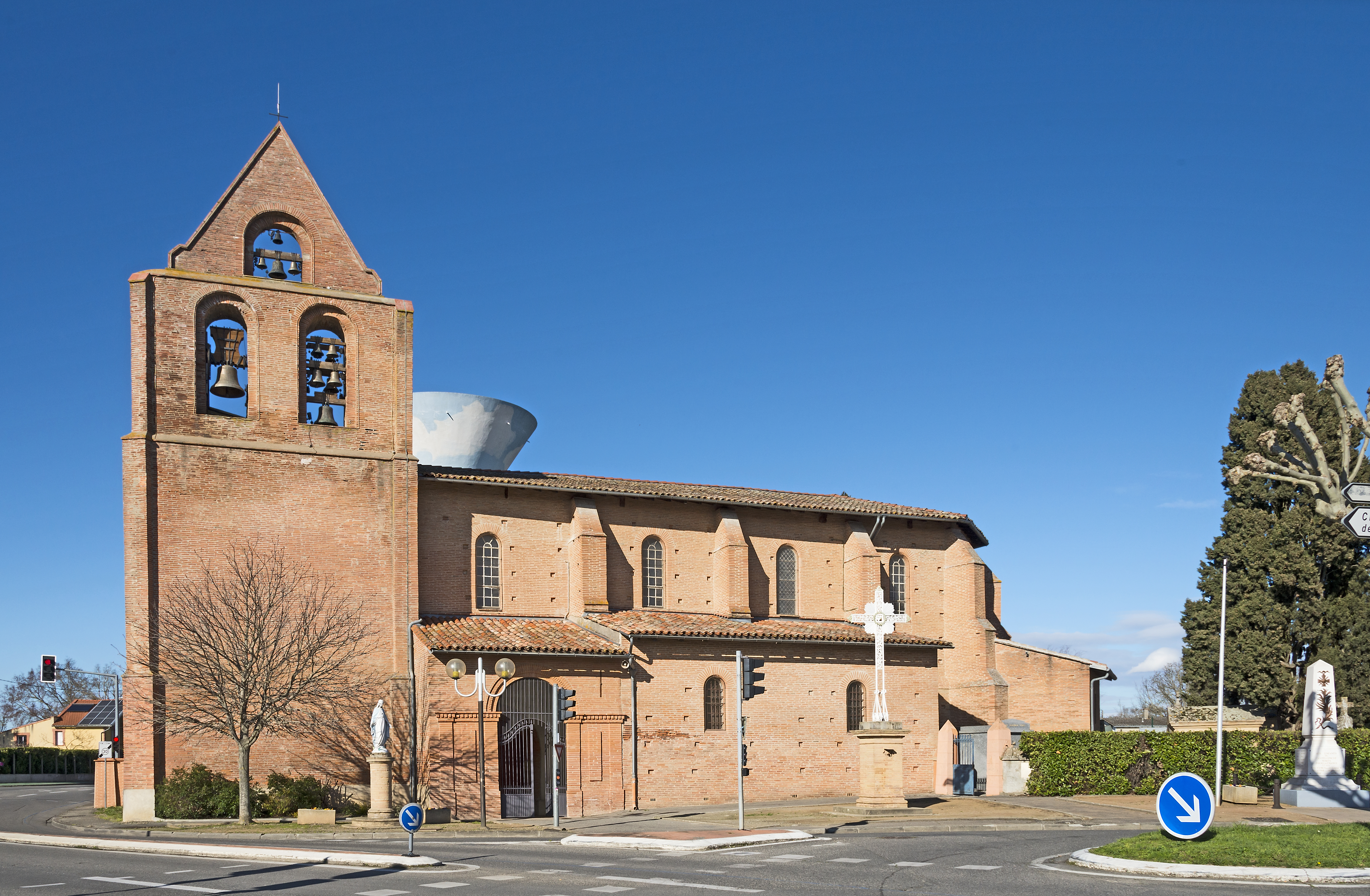
Church Saint-Étienne

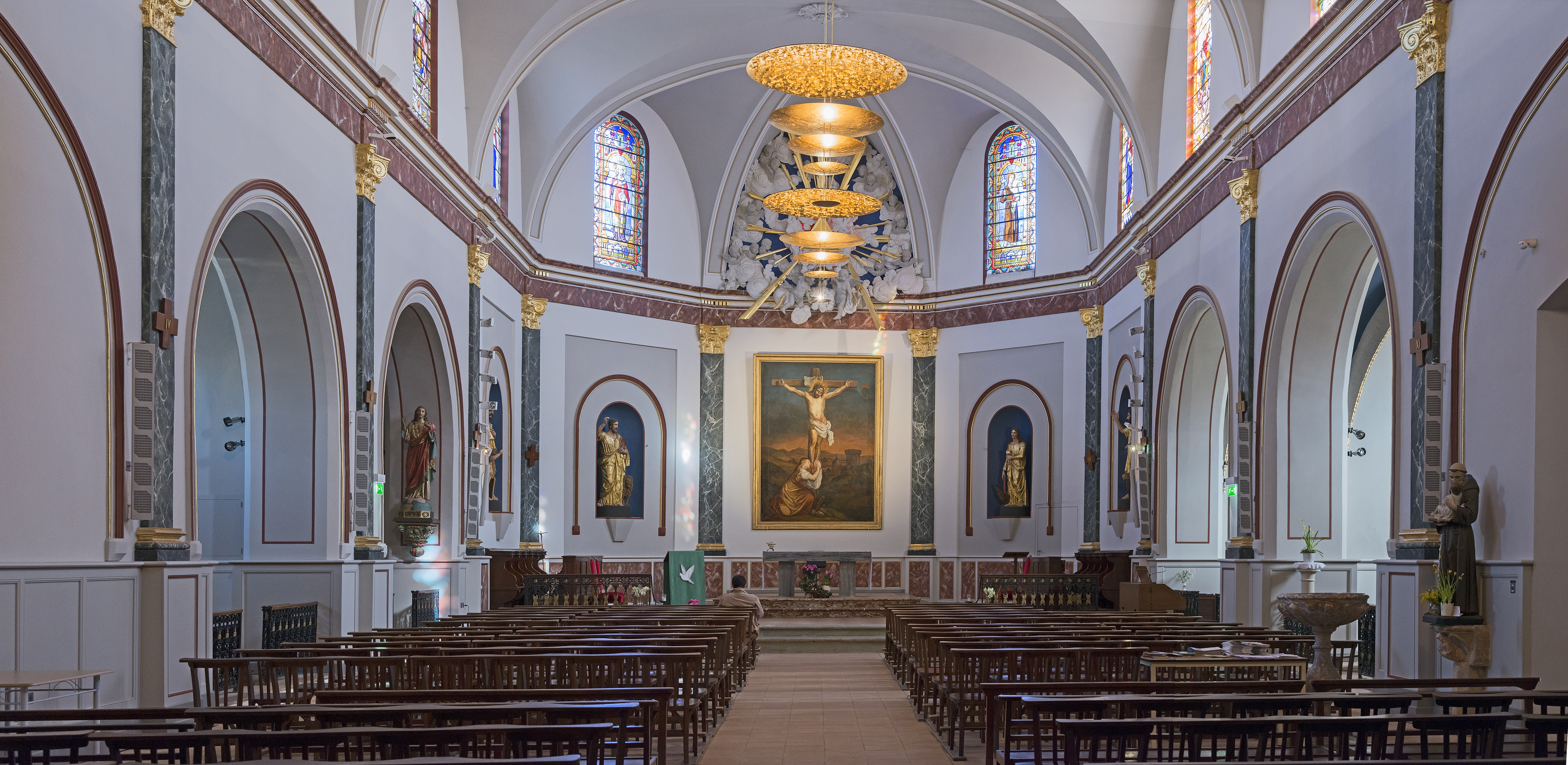
Church interior

== See also ==
- Communes of the Haute-Garonne department
