= Saint-Jory =

- Commune
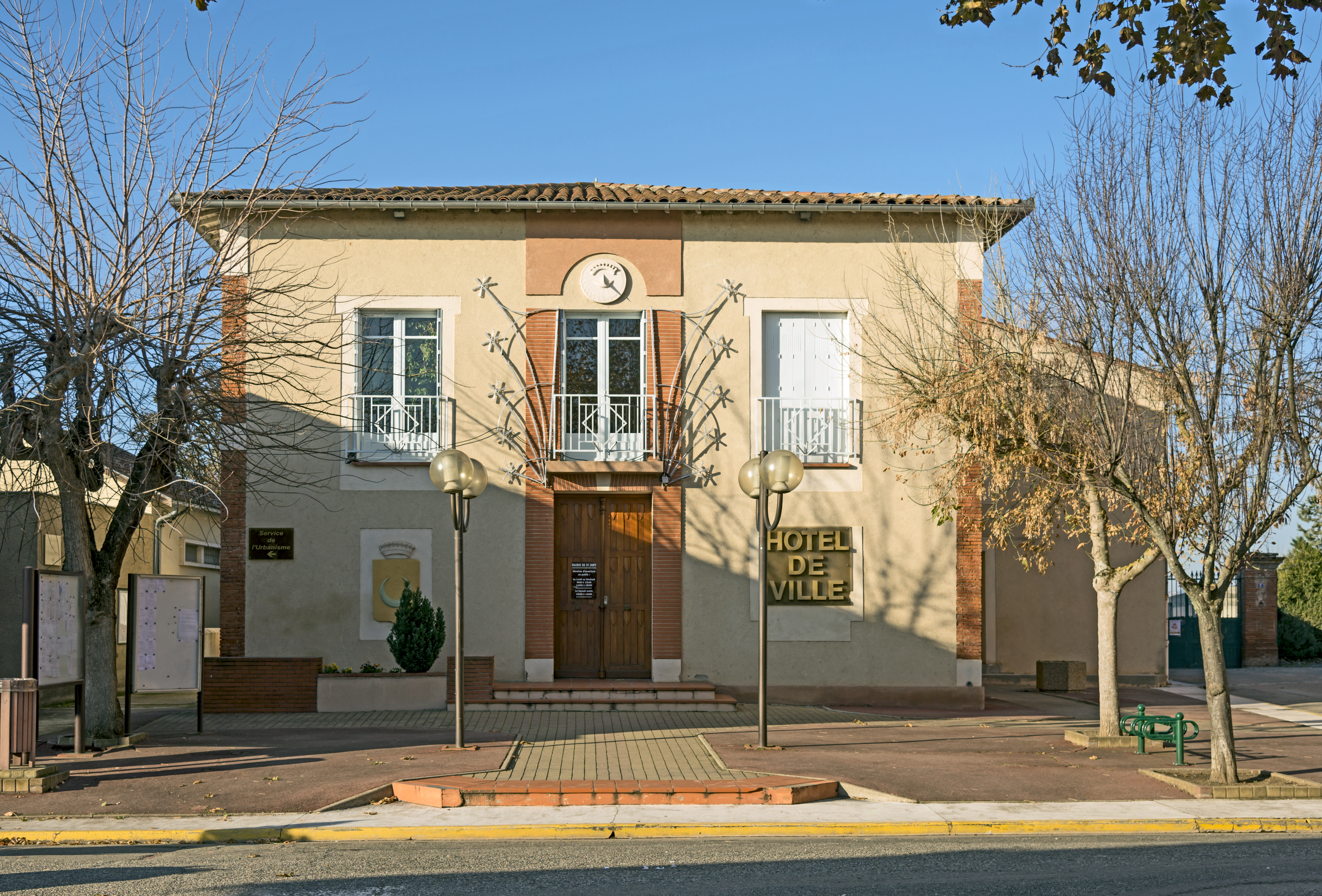
- The town hall in Saint-Jory

- Coat of arms
- Location of Saint-Jory
- Location within France Location within Occitanie
- Coordinates: 43°44′35″N 1°22′14″E
- Country: France
- Region: Occitania
- Department: Haute-Garonne
- Arrondissement: Toulouse
- Canton: Castelginest
- Intercommunality: Toulouse Métropole

Government
  - Mayor (2023–2026): Victor Denouvion
- Area^{1}: 19.1 km^{2} (7.4 sq mi)
- Elevation: 119 m (390 ft)
- Highest elevation: 125 m (410 ft)
- Lowest elevation: 105 m (344 ft)
- Population (2023): 8,662
  - Density: 454/km^{2} (1,170/sq mi)
- Time zone: UTC+01:00 (CET)
  - Summer (DST): UTC+02:00 (CEST)
- INSEE/Postal code: 31490 /31790
- ^{1} French Land Register data, which excludes lakes, ponds, glaciers > 1 km^{2} (0.386 sq mi or 247 acres) and river estuaries.

Saint-Jory (French pronunciation: [sɛ̃ ʒɔʁi]; Occitan: Sent Jòri) is a commune in the Haute-Garonne department in southwestern France. It is served by Saint-Jory station on the Bordeaux-Toulouse line.

== Population ==
Historical population
Year	Pop.	±% p.a.
1968	2,112	—
1975	2,533	+2.63%
1982	2,760	+1.23%
1990	3,244	+2.04%
1999	4,069	+2.55%
2007	4,920	+2.40%
2012	5,509	+2.29%
2017	5,797	+1.02%
2023	8,662	+6.92%
Source: INSEE

== Sights ==
The Château de Saint-Jory is a 16th-century castle which is listed as a historic site by the French Ministry of Culture.

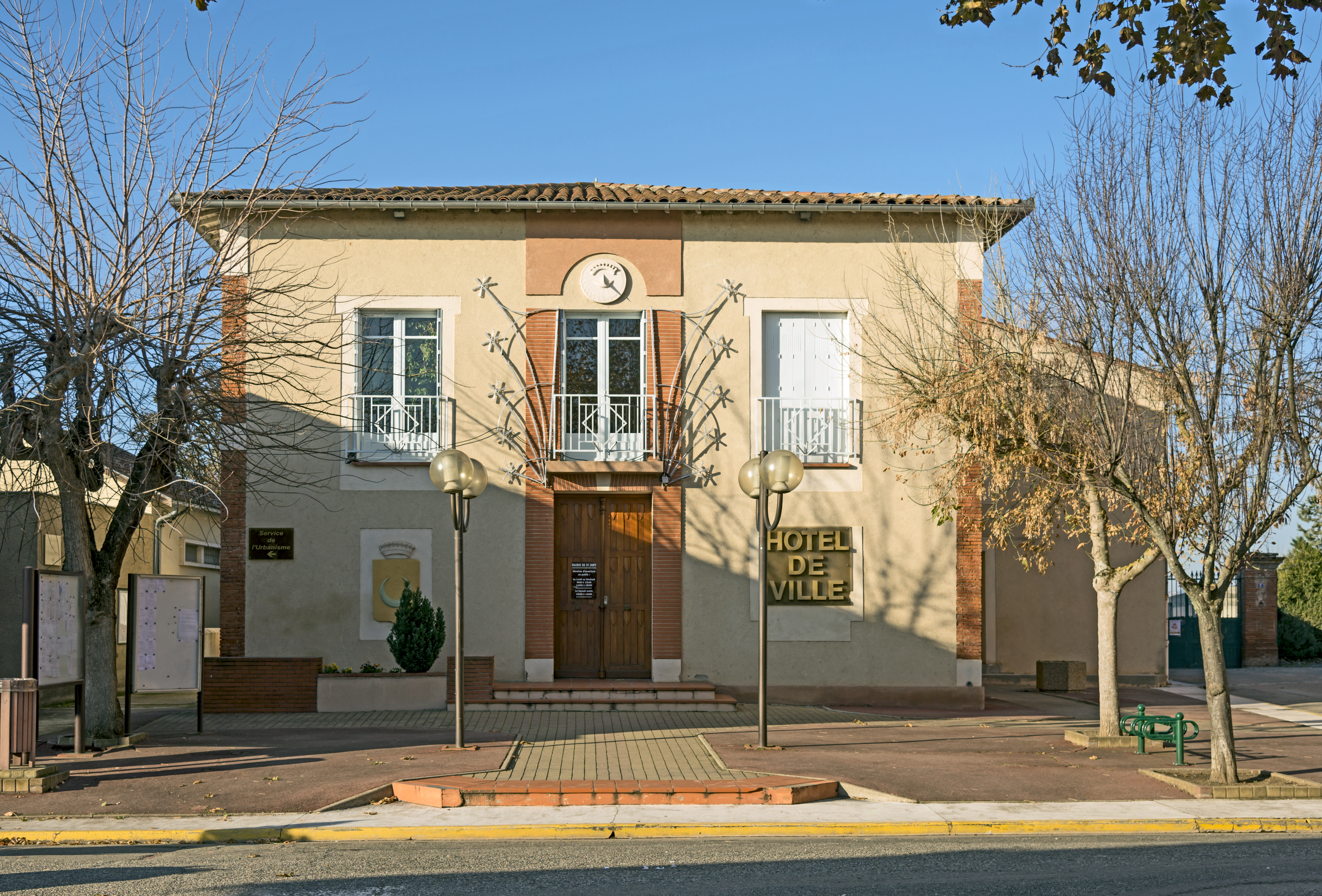
Town hall

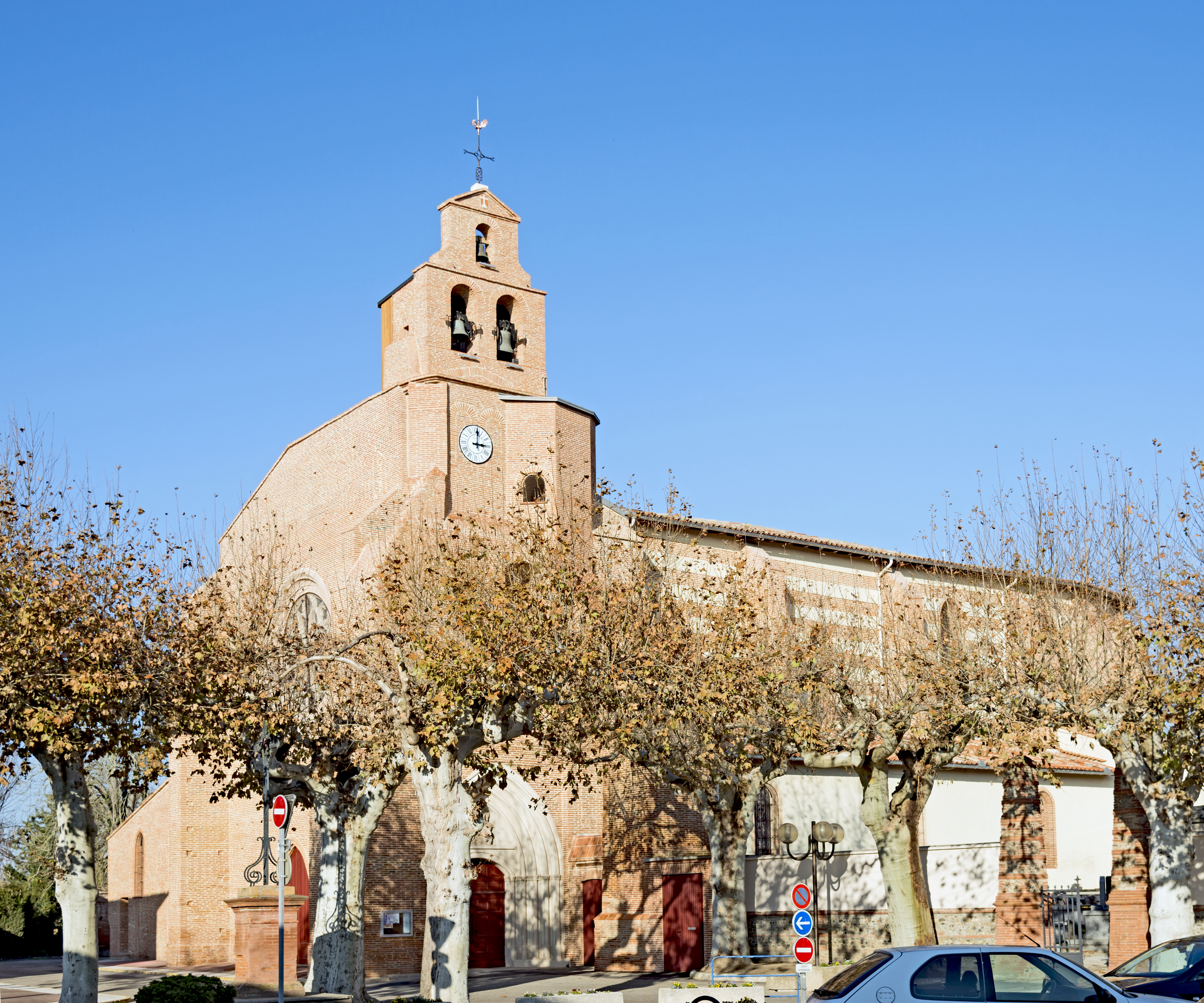
Church

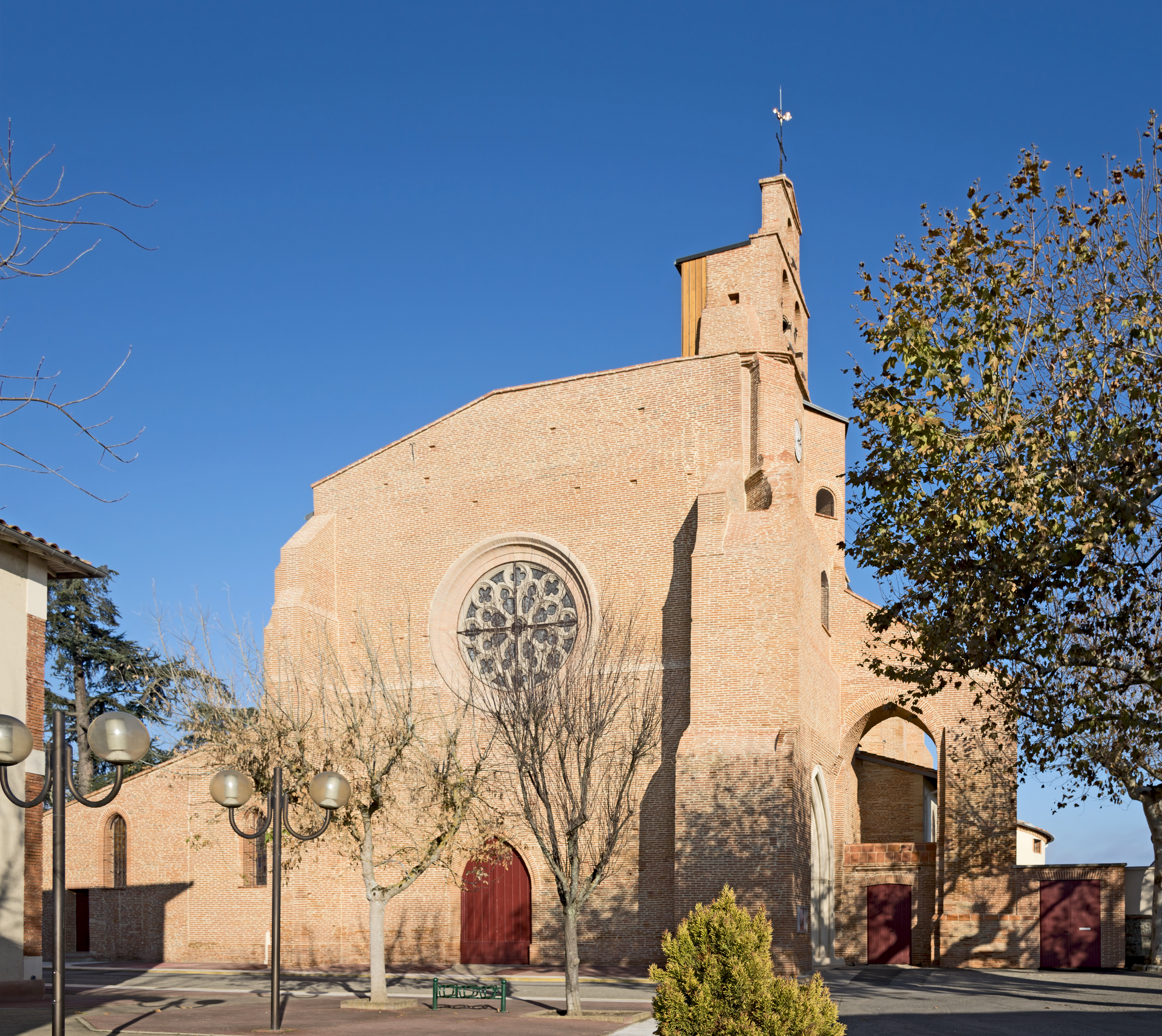

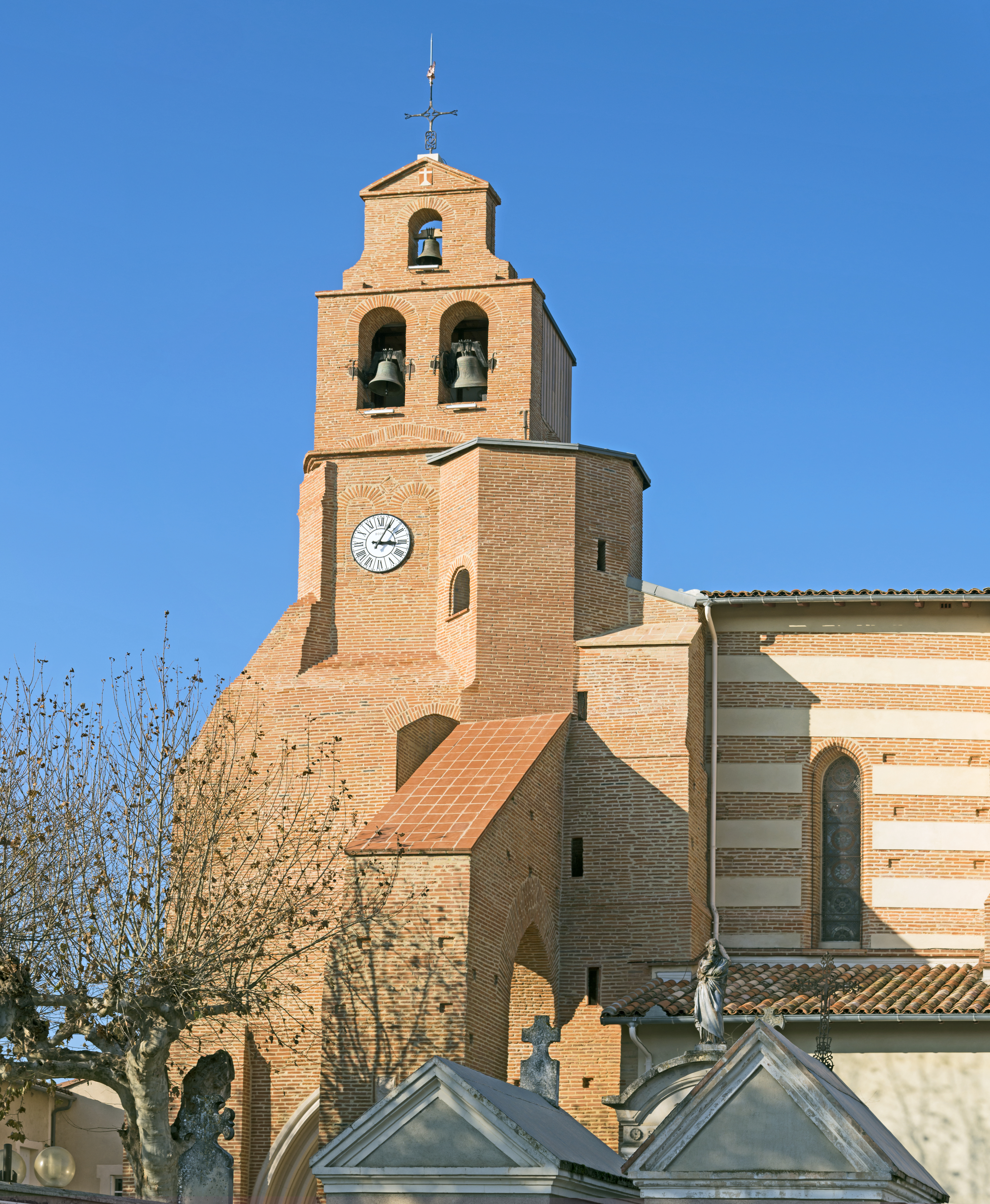

== See also ==
- Communes of the Haute-Garonne department
