= Bruguières =

- Commune
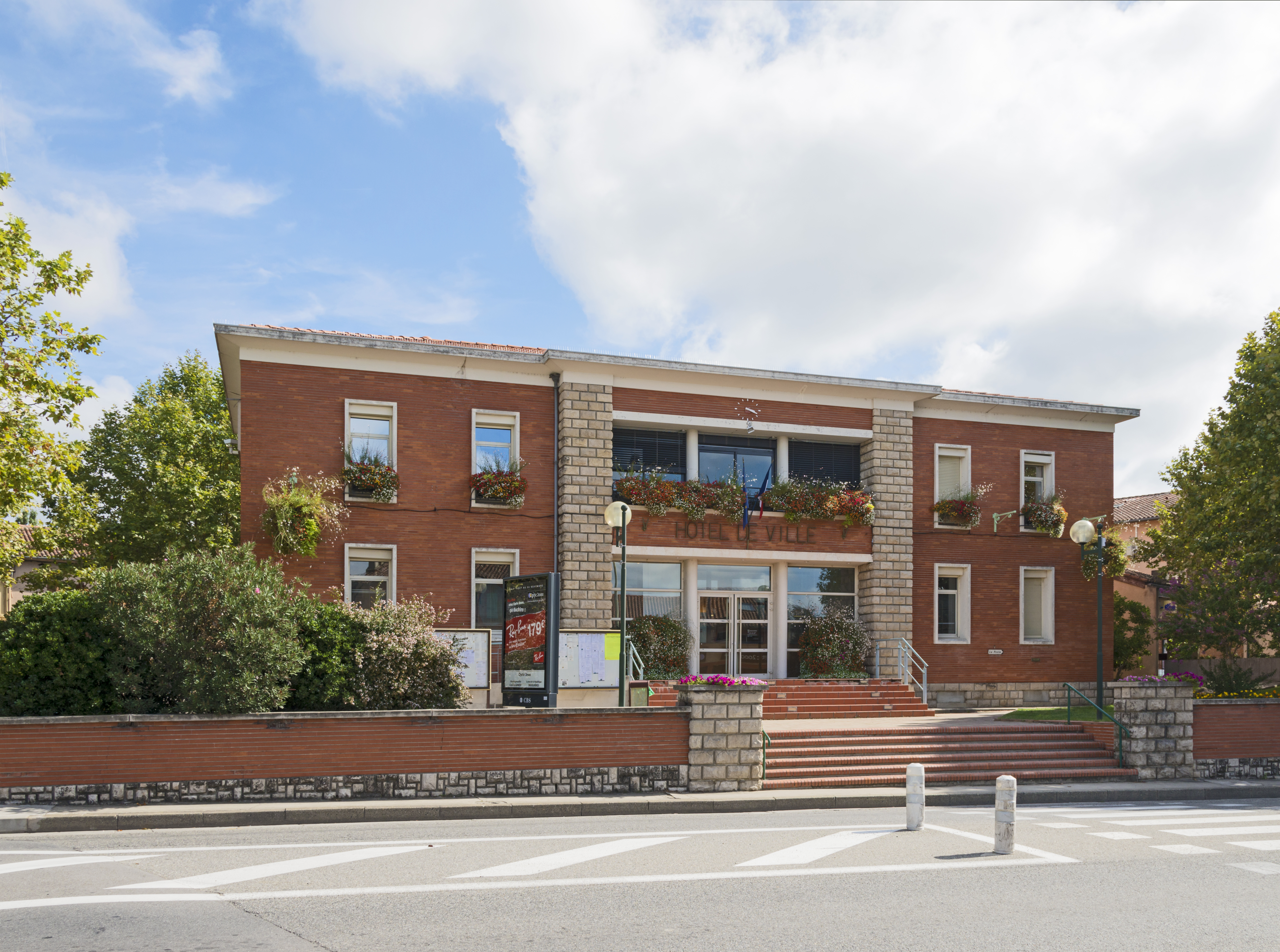
- The town hall in Bruguières

- Coat of arms
- Location of Bruguières
- Location within France Location within Occitanie
- Coordinates: 43°43′30″N 1°24′44″E
- Country: France
- Region: Occitania
- Department: Haute-Garonne
- Arrondissement: Toulouse
- Canton: Castelginest
- Intercommunality: Toulouse Métropole

Government
  - Mayor (2024–2026): Arnaud Sigu
- Area^{1}: 9.03 km^{2} (3.49 sq mi)
- Elevation: 130 m (430 ft)
- Highest elevation: 175 m (574 ft)
- Lowest elevation: 116 m (381 ft)
- Population (2023): 6,202
  - Density: 687/km^{2} (1,780/sq mi)
- Time zone: UTC+01:00 (CET)
  - Summer (DST): UTC+02:00 (CEST)
- INSEE/Postal code: 31091 /31150
- ^{1} French Land Register data, which excludes lakes, ponds, glaciers > 1 km^{2} (0.386 sq mi or 247 acres) and river estuaries.

Bruguières (French pronunciation: [bʁyɡjɛʁ]; Occitan: Bruguièras) is a commune of the Haute-Garonne department in southwestern France.

== Population ==
Historical population
Year	Pop.	±% p.a.
1968	1,169	—
1975	1,726	+5.72%
1982	2,524	+5.58%
1990	3,056	+2.42%
1999	3,862	+2.63%
2007	4,923	+3.08%
2012	5,026	+0.41%
2017	5,832	+3.02%
2023	6,202	+1.03%
Source: INSEE

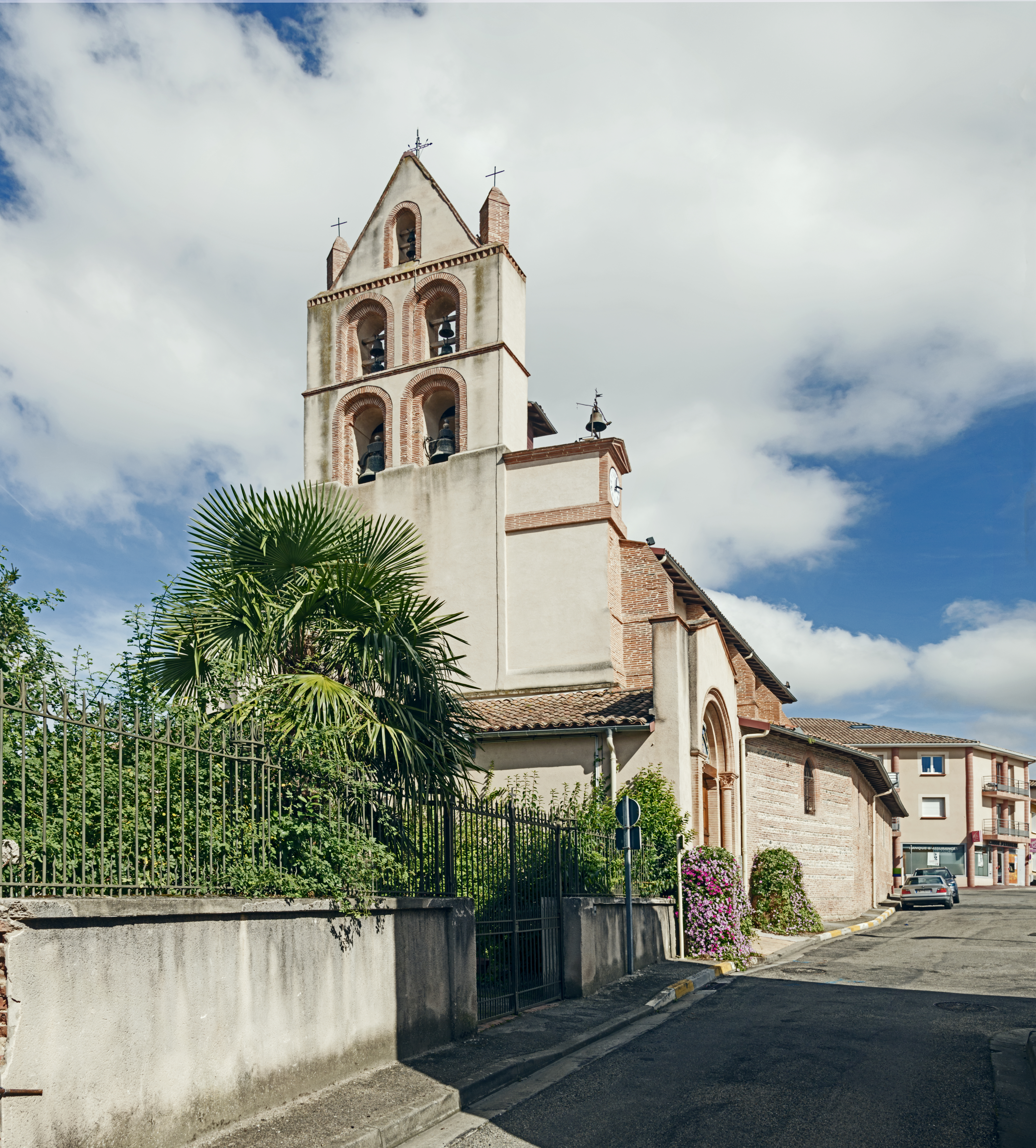
Église Saint-Martin

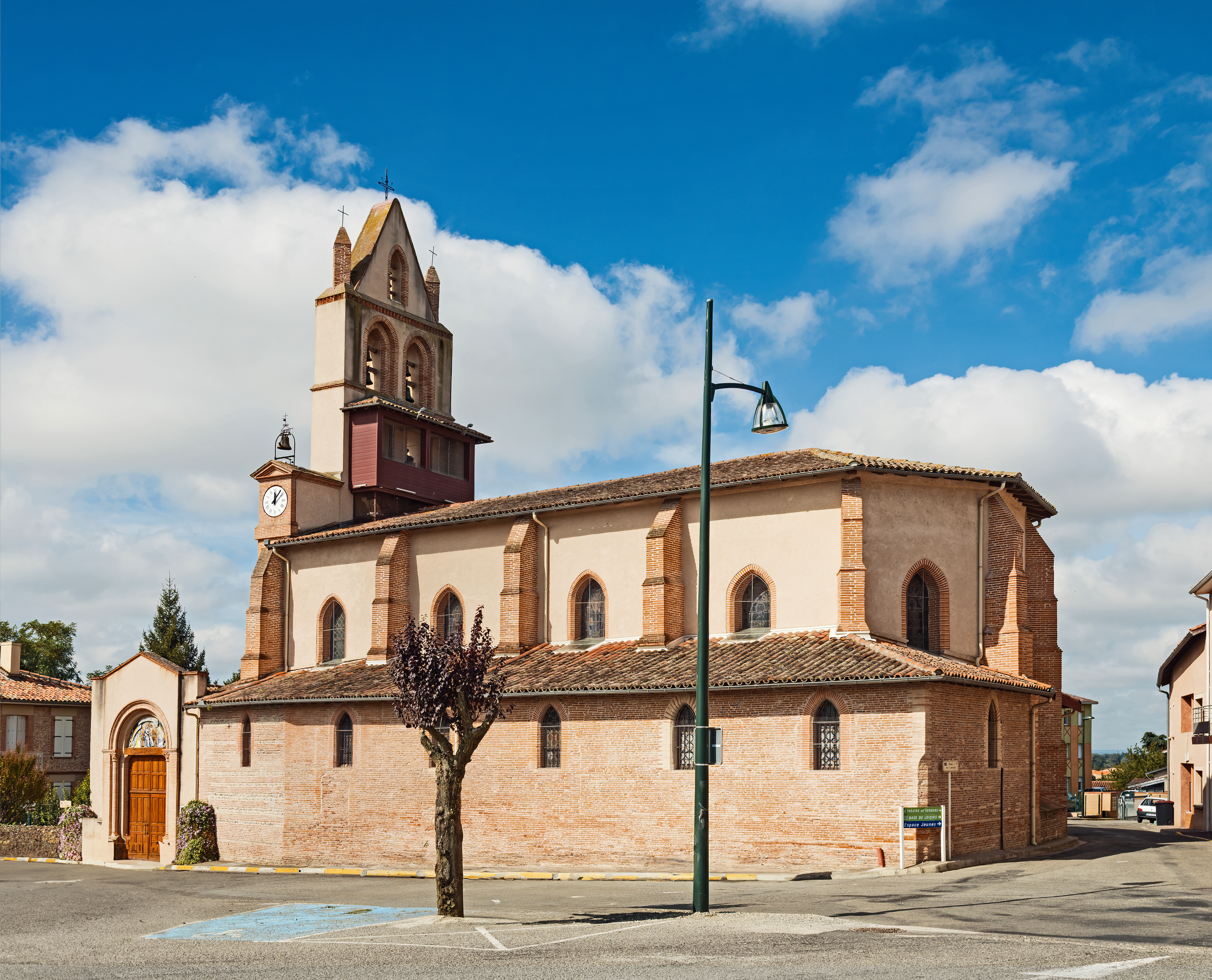
Église Saint-Martin

== Twin town ==
- Xeraco, Spain

== See also ==
- Communes of the Haute-Garonne department
