= Fonbeauzard =

- Commune
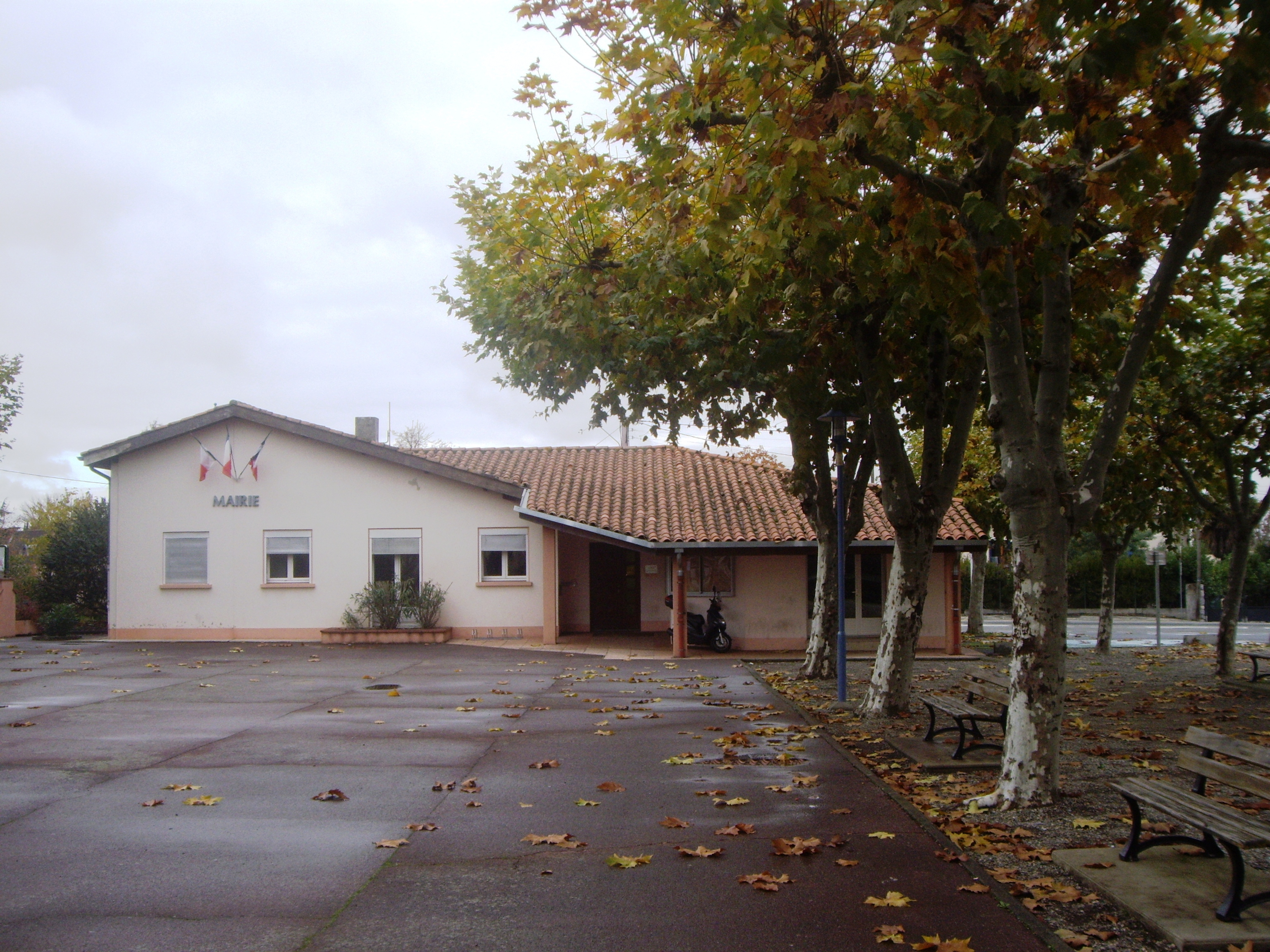
- Town hall

- Coat of arms
- Location of Fonbeauzard
- Location within France Location within Occitanie
- Coordinates: 43°40′42″N 1°25′59″E
- Country: France
- Region: Occitania
- Department: Haute-Garonne
- Arrondissement: Toulouse
- Canton: Castelginest
- Intercommunality: Toulouse Métropole

Government
  - Mayor (2020–2026): Robert Grimaud
- Area^{1}: 1.32 km^{2} (0.51 sq mi)
- Elevation: 125 m (410 ft)
- Highest elevation: 135 m (443 ft)
- Lowest elevation: 127 m (417 ft)
- Population (2023): 3,204
  - Density: 2,430/km^{2} (6,290/sq mi)
- Time zone: UTC+01:00 (CET)
  - Summer (DST): UTC+02:00 (CEST)
- INSEE/Postal code: 31186 /31140
- ^{1} French Land Register data, which excludes lakes, ponds, glaciers > 1 km^{2} (0.386 sq mi or 247 acres) and river estuaries.

Fonbeauzard (French pronunciation: [fɔ̃bozaʁ]; Occitan: Fontbausard) is a commune in the Haute-Garonne department in southwestern France.

== Population ==
Historical population
Year	Pop.	±% p.a.
1968	278	—
1975	588	+11.30%
1982	1,286	+11.83%
1990	2,393	+8.07%
1999	2,603	+0.94%
2007	2,789	+0.87%
2012	2,854	+0.46%
2017	2,973	+0.82%
2023	3,204	+1.25%
Source: INSEE

== See also ==
- Communes of the Haute-Garonne department
