= Monastier di Treviso =

- Comune
- Comune di Monastier di Treviso
- Location within Italy Location within Veneto
- Coordinates: 45°39′N 12°26′E
- Country: Italy
- Region: Veneto
- Province: Province of Treviso (TV)

Area
  - Total: 25.4 km^{2} (9.8 sq mi)

Population (Dec. 2004)
  - Total: 3,732
  - Density: 147/km^{2} (381/sq mi)
- Time zone: UTC+1 (CET)
  - Summer (DST): UTC+2 (CEST)
- Postal code: 31050
- Dialing code: 0422
- Website: Official website

Monastier di Treviso is a comune (municipality) in the Province of Treviso in the Italian region Veneto, located about 25 kilometres (16 mi) northeast of Venice and about 14 kilometres (9 mi) east of Treviso. As of 31 December 2004, it had a population of 3,732 and an area of 25.4 square kilometres (9.8 mi^{2}).

Monastier di Treviso borders the following municipalities: Fossalta di Piave, Meolo, Roncade, San Biagio di Callalta, Zenson di Piave.

== Demographic evolution ==
Historical population

| Year | Pop. | ±% |
|---|---|---|
| 1861 | ? | — |
| 1871 | 2,755 | — |
| 1881 | 2,902 | +5.3% |
| 1901 | 2,976 | +2.5% |
| 1911 | 3,664 | +23.1% |

| Year | Pop. | ±% |
|---|---|---|
| 1921 | 4,027 | +9.9% |
| 1931 | 4,194 | +4.1% |
| 1936 | 4,036 | −3.8% |
| 1951 | 4,133 | +2.4% |
| 1961 | 3,291 | −20.4% |

| Year | Pop. | ±% |
|---|---|---|
| 1971 | 3,015 | −8.4% |
| 1981 | 3,123 | +3.6% |
| 1991 | 3,424 | +9.6% |
| 2001 | 3,554 | +3.8% |

Source: Data from ISTAT
