= Château de Saint-Jory =

16th-century castle in Haute-Garonne, France

Coordinates: 43°44′37″N 1°22′15″E

The Château de Saint-Jory is a 16th-century castle in the commune of Saint-Jory in the Haute-Garonne département of France.

Privately owned, it has been listed since 1927 as a monument historique by the French Ministry of Culture.

== See also ==
- List of castles in France
