= Lespinasse, Haute-Garonne =

Lespinasse
- Commune
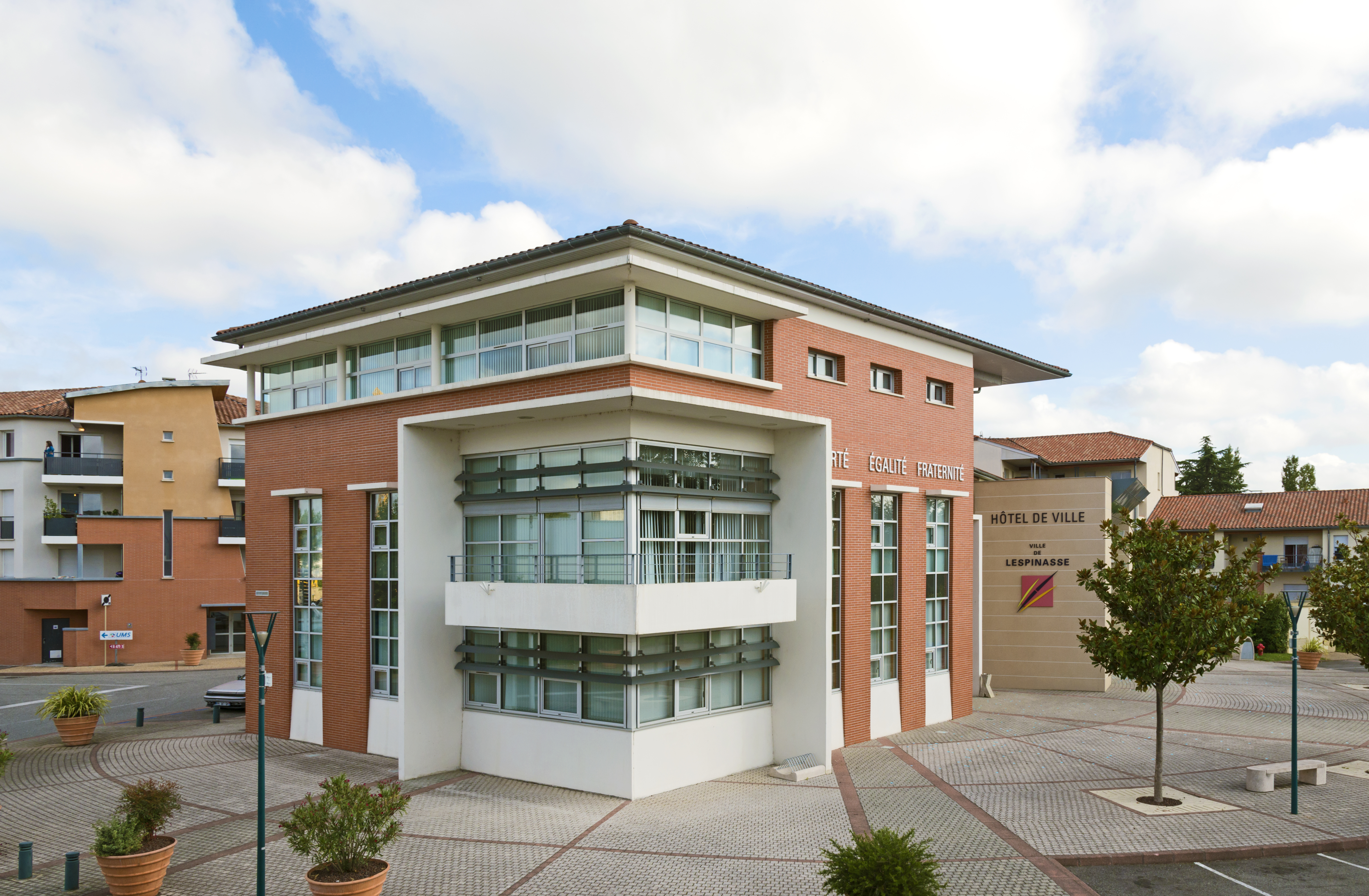
- Town hall

- Coat of arms
- Location of Lespinasse
- Location within France Location within Occitanie
- Coordinates: 43°42′33″N 1°23′11″E
- Country: France
- Region: Occitania
- Department: Haute-Garonne
- Arrondissement: Toulouse
- Canton: Castelginest
- Intercommunality: Toulouse Métropole

Government
  - Mayor (2020–2026): Alain Alençon
- Area^{1}: 4.24 km^{2} (1.64 sq mi)
- Elevation: 119 m (390 ft)
- Highest elevation: 127 m (417 ft)
- Lowest elevation: 117 m (384 ft)
- Population (2023): 3,251
  - Density: 767/km^{2} (1,990/sq mi)
- Time zone: UTC+01:00 (CET)
  - Summer (DST): UTC+02:00 (CEST)
- INSEE/Postal code: 31293 /31150
- ^{1} French Land Register data, which excludes lakes, ponds, glaciers > 1 km^{2} (0.386 sq mi or 247 acres) and river estuaries.

Lespinasse (French pronunciation: [lɛspinas]; Occitan: L'Espinassa) is a commune in the Haute-Garonne department in southwestern France.

== Population ==
Historical population
Year	Pop.	±% p.a.
1968	557	—
1975	866	+6.51%
1982	1,002	+2.11%
1990	1,413	+4.39%
1999	1,864	+3.13%
2007	2,401	+3.22%
2012	2,573	+1.39%
2017	2,737	+1.24%
2023	3,251	+2.91%
Source: INSEE

== See also ==
- Communes of the Haute-Garonne department
