= Georg Wannagat =

German jurist (1916–2006)

Georg Paul Wannagat (26 June 1916 – 7 September 2006) was a German jurist and President of the Bundessozialgericht.

== Biography ==
Wannagat was born in Brzeziny (Poland) to the Protestant Pastor Albert Ludwig Wannagat and Lucie Adeline née Jahn. He studied law at the Universities of Warsaw and Erlangen and passed his juridical exams in 1938 and 1942.

After World War II he started to work at the Württemberg higher insurance office (Württembergisches Oberversicherungsamt) and became a judge at the State Court of Social law of Baden-Württemberg in 1954. In 1962 he became the President of the State Court of Social law of Hesse and in 1969 President of the Federal Social Court (Bundessozialgericht) in Kassel. He retired in 1984.

Wannagat was an honorary Professor at the University of Tübingen (1965) and the Johann Wolfgang Goethe-Universität, Frankfurt am Main (1967).

Wannagat died in Kassel.

== Publications ==
- Lehrbuch des Sozialversicherungsrechts. Bd. 1, 1965
- Entwicklung des Sozialrechts. Aufgabe der Rechtsprechung: Festgabe aus Anlass des 100jährigen Bestehens der sozialgerichtlichen Rechtsprechung, Kassel 1984
- Kassel als Stadt der Juristen (Juristinnen) und der Gerichte in ihrer tausendjährigen Geschichte, Kassel 1990
