= San Biagio di Callalta =

San Biagio di Callalta San Biajo (Venetian)
- Comune
- Comune di San Biagio di Callalta
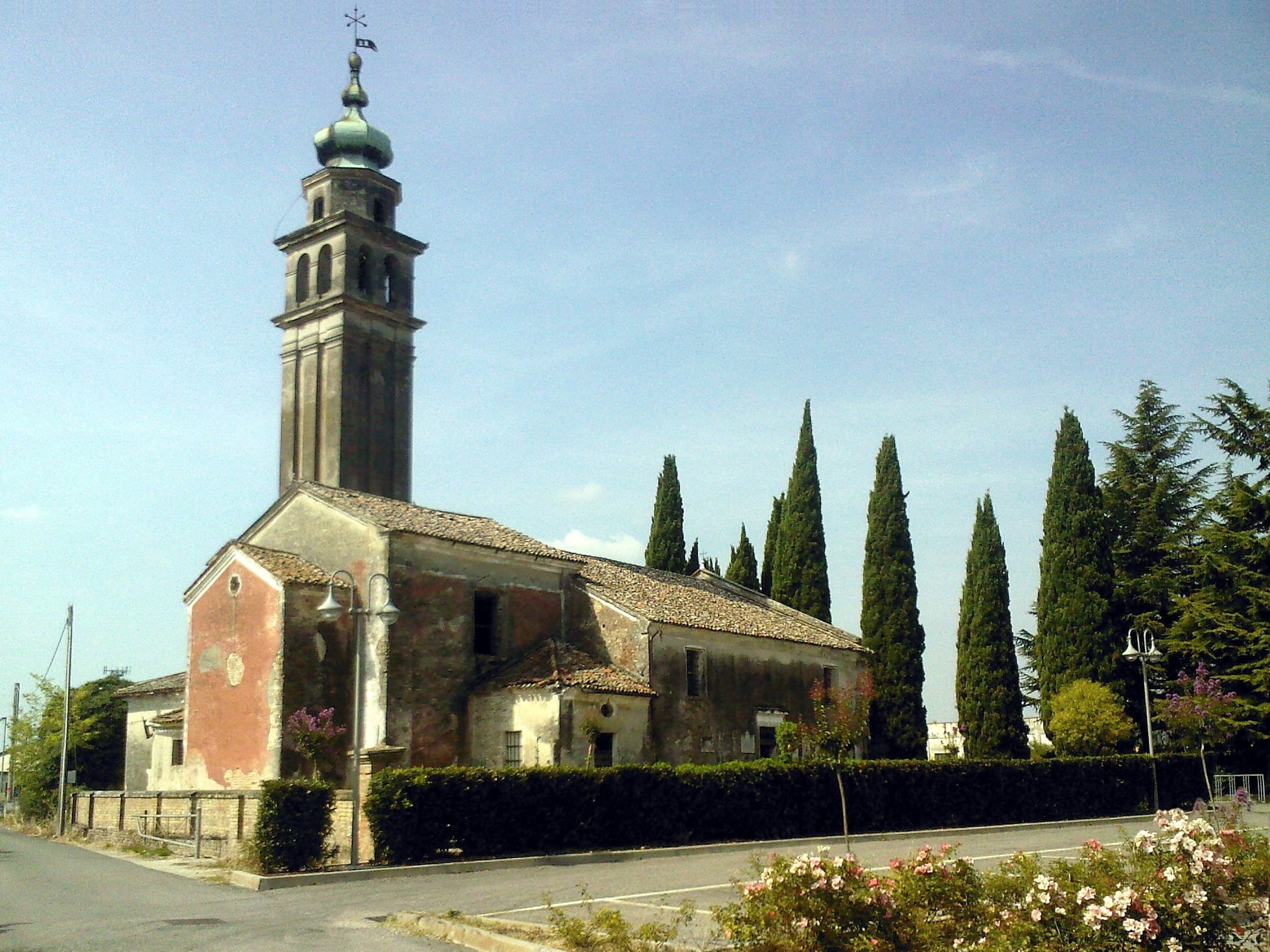
- Pieve of San Biagio.

- Coat of arms

- Location within Italy Location within Veneto
- Coordinates: 45°41′N 12°23′E
- Country: Italy
- Region: Veneto
- Province: Treviso (TV)
- Frazioni: Cavrié, Fagaré della Battaglia, Olmi-San Floriano, Rovaré, San Martino, Sant'Andrea di Barbarana, Spercenigo

Government
  - Mayor: Alberto Cappelletto

Area
  - Total: 48.51 km^{2} (18.73 sq mi)
- Elevation: 10 m (33 ft)

Population (31 December 2015)
  - Total: 12,950
  - Density: 267.0/km^{2} (691.4/sq mi)
- Demonym: Sanbiagese(i)
- Time zone: UTC+1 (CET)
  - Summer (DST): UTC+2 (CEST)
- Postal code: 31042 and 31048
- Dialing code: 0422
- Patron saint: St. Blaise
- Saint day: 3 February
- Website: Official website

San Biagio di Callalta (Italian: [sam ˈbjaːdʒo di kalˈlalta]; Venetian: San Biajo [saŋ ˈbjajo]) is a comune (municipality) in the province of Treviso, Veneto, north-eastern Italy.

It is the birthplace of Pierre Cardin.

== History ==
=== Ancient history ===
Today's San Biagio di Callalta was once inhabited by Veneti, an Indo-European population that settled in north-eastern Italy after the middle of the second millennium BCE and developed its own original civilization during the next millennium. During Roman times the Veneto was part of Regio X Venetia et Histria. The territory gained greater importance thanks to the construction of the Via Annia, the Via Postumia and a road that connected them. Artifacts of that period have been found in the hamlets of Rovaré (terracotta fragments) and Spercenigo (funeral urn and a wine amphora) along with a cremation furnace ruin in Ca'Lion.

San Biagio di Callalta gets its name from San Biagio (bishop and martyr) and to the military road "Callis Alta", originally built in the 10th or 11th century, after the original ancient route between Tarvisium and Opitergium had been abandoned.

In the late Roman period (3rd and 4th century CE) two sites are mentioned that were in the territory of what was to become San Biagio: Prandecinum, corresponding to present day Rovaré, and Caurillium, corresponding to present day Cavrié.

=== Middle Ages ===
With the advent of Christianity, in these two sites, two churches were erected: Santa Maria de Caurillium, one of the first churches named as part of the new Diocese of Tarvisium and San Lorenzo in Prandecino, which was destroyed in the first decades of the nineteenth century.

Other ancient churches in the territory of San Biagio are San Martino, San Floriano, San Menna, San Sisto a Nerbon, built over an ancient mound, the church of Spercenigo and the old parish church of San Biagio, built in the late 1300s but now in ruins.

At the end of the tenth century, the territories of the future San Biagio were part of the area of influence of the powerful Abbey of Monastier. The work of the Benedictine monks here led to the development of the settlements of Rovaré, Fagaré and San Andrea di Barbarana.

In 1314 the parish known as “Caurille” moved south of the “Callis Alta” military road and embankments that were built to counteract the floods of the Piave River. Thus starting from the fourteenth century along this road a new town arose – San Biagio, the current municipal capital – with the resulting decline of Cavrié and Pradencino. The “Callalta” divided the territory of San Biagio into two parts: the part to the North belonged to the Zosagna di Sopra (from 1339, Venice provided an administrative arrangement of the Treviso territory or podesteria, which encompassed San Biagio) and included the localities of Cavrié, Valdrigo, Camporocoler, San Biagio, Campolongo, Fagaré, Volta di Fagaré and Villatella, the South belonged to Zosagna di Sotto and included Spercenigo, Bagnon, Rovaré, Riva de Perdencin, Nerbon, San Florian and Villa Cucca. The area had fallen into the orbit of Treviso and followed its fate until the final inclusion in the Republic of Venice, at the end of the fourteenth century.

During the period of the Republic of Venice, San Biagio enjoyed relative tranquility. Venice needed access to large quantities of oak and beech timber. The island city itself was devoid of any forests, so it turned to its mainland holdings for this vital resource. Magnificent villas were built here, erected by the nobles and patricians of Venice, including the Sugana, Sala, Giudici, Da Lezze, Navagero and Caotorta.

=== Modern Era ===
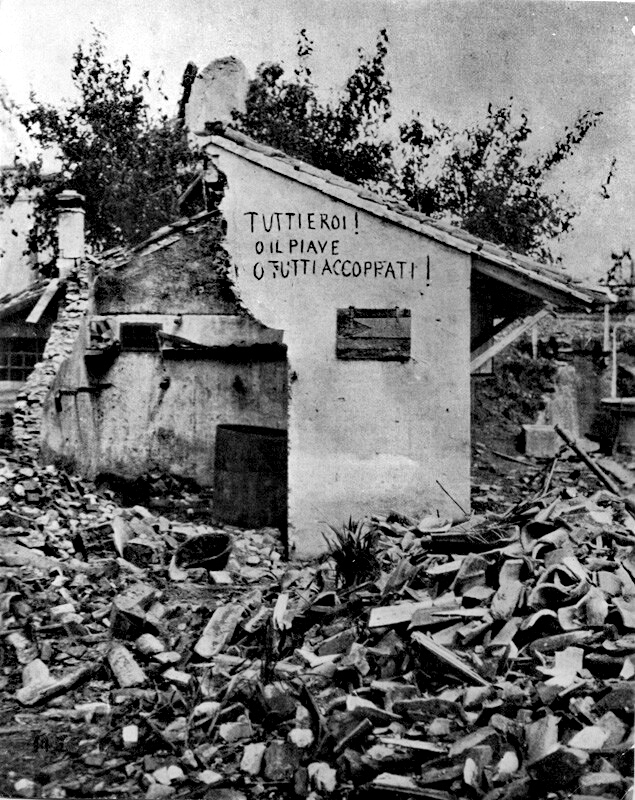
Bombed-out house with the famous quotation of the Italian Army at the Battle of the Solstice in Sant'Andrea di Barbarana

The territory was administered by the Republic of Venice until its fall of May 12, 1797. After the signing of the Treaty of Campo Formio and the assignment of the territory to Austria, the area was part of the Habsburg Empire. The territory remained (more or less) under Austrian sovereignty until the outcome of the Third War of Italian Independence, when the Armistice of Cormons transferred the Veneto to the Kingdom of Italy which was ratified with the signing of the Treaty of Vienna (1866) on October 3, 1866.

San Biagio was affected by the consequences of the outbreak of the First World War especially after the Battle of Caporetto in 1917. Then the front line moved to the Piave River and forced the people of the area to exit to the Po Valley while the Austro-Hungarian armed forces bombarded their home territory causing considerable damage.

The involvement reached its peak, when in June 1918, the Battle of the Solstice was fought here. This was the last great offensive launched by the Austro-Hungarians during the conflict and the Italian Army held, turning the tide of the war. To commemorate the tragic event, the ossuary of Fagaré was erected, along the Callalta Road, where the Austro-Hungarian troops reached their furthest advance. The ossuary contains two famous quotations:

- "Tutti eroi! O il Piave, o tutti accoppati!” — Everyone a hero! Either the Piave, or be killed!
- “È meglio un giorno da leone che cento anni da pecora." — It is better to spend one day as a lion than 100 years as a sheep.

== Places of Interest ==
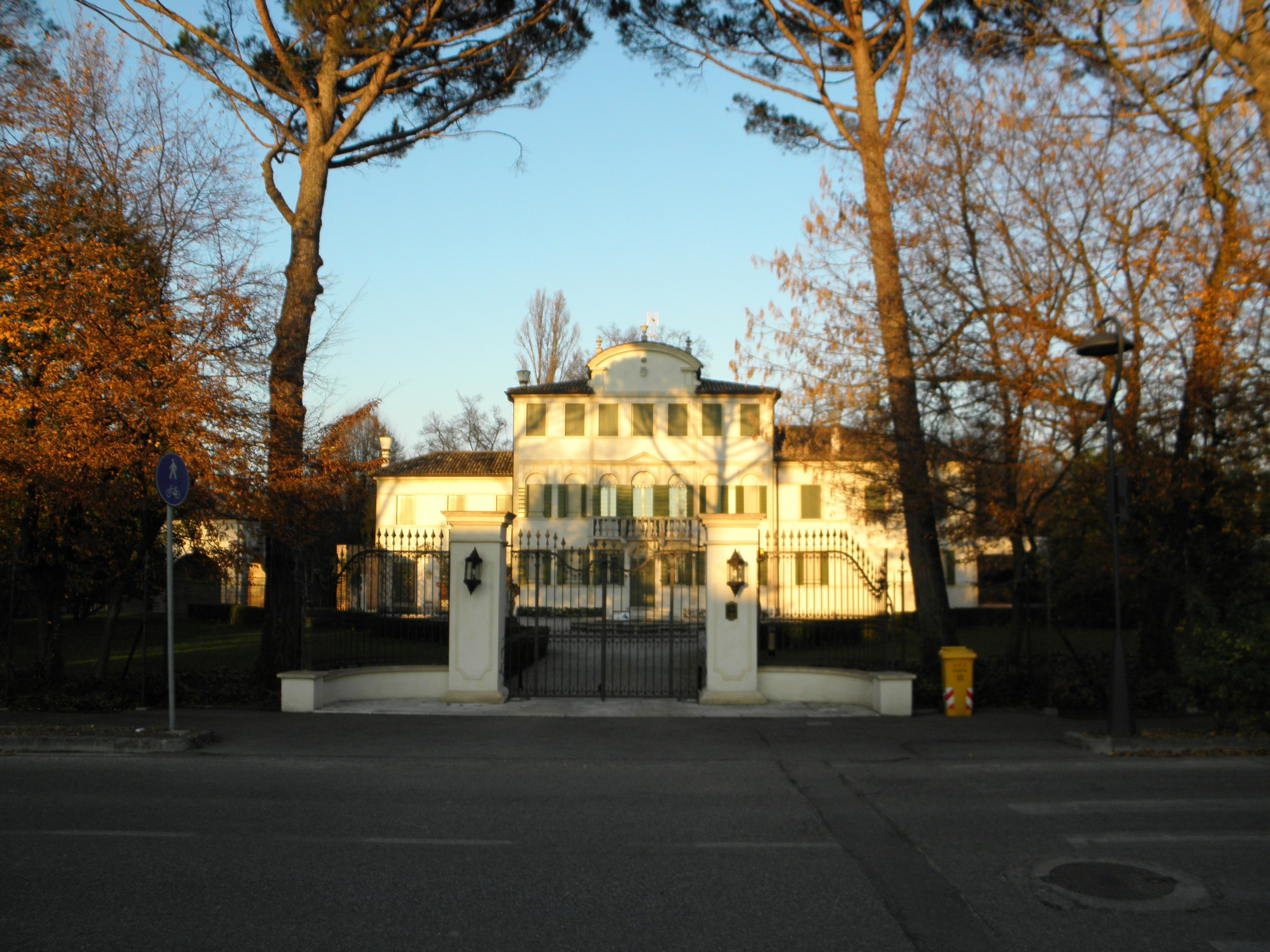
Villa Marzotto Caotorta in Spercenigo

- Villa Navagero-Erizzo in Rovaré built at the end of the 17th century
- Villa Mariani
- Villa Marzotto-Caotorta in Spercenigo
- Villa De Rossi in Cavrié

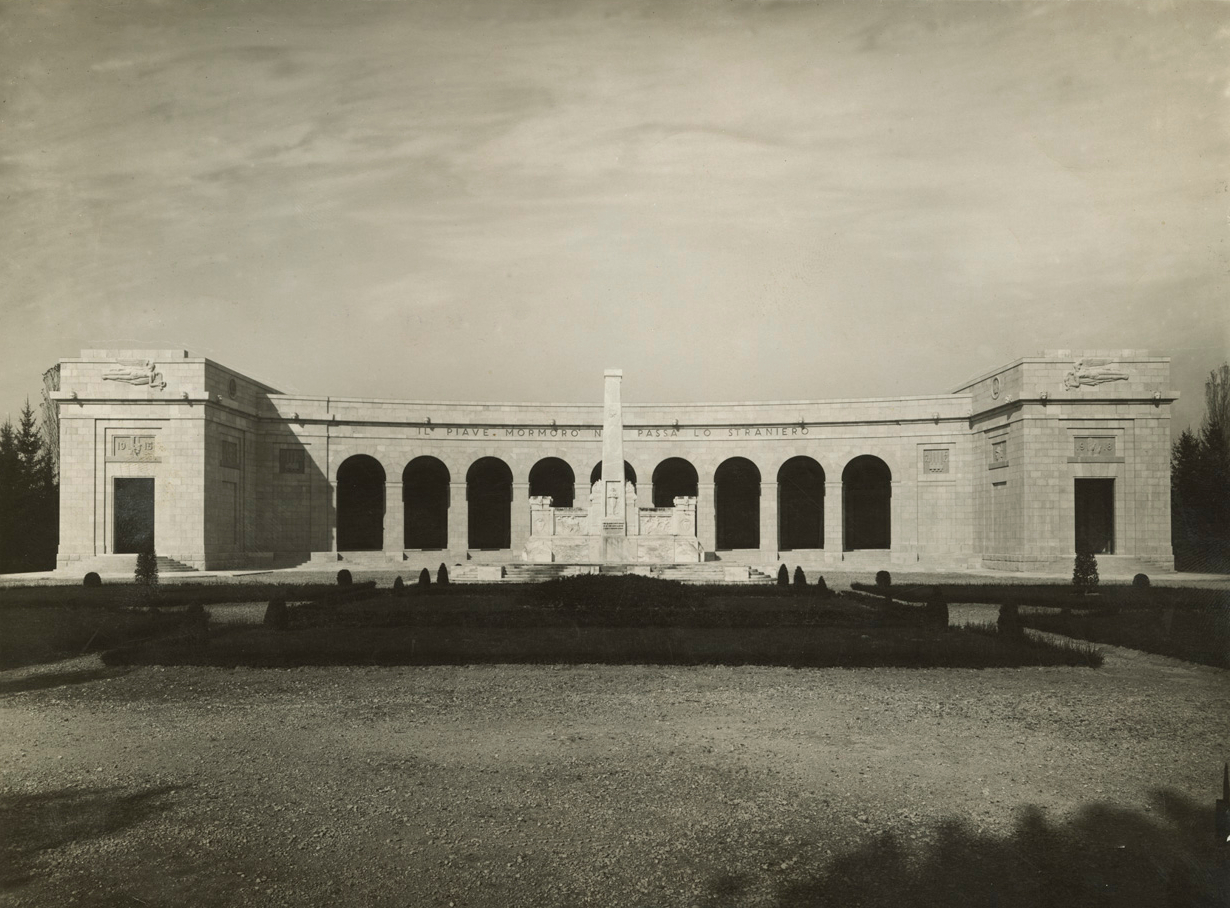
Il Sacrario Militare di Fagaré della Battaglia

- Villa Onesti (Remains of Villa da Lezze)
- Fagaré Della Battaglia, Sacrario Militare
- Abbazia di Monastier
- Church of San Martino
- Church of San Floriano
- Church of San Menna
- Church of San Sisto a Nerbon
- The Church of Spercenigo
- Old parish church of San Biagio

== Sister cities ==
San Biagio di Callalta is twinned with:

- L'Union, France, since 1995

== See also ==
- Monastier di Treviso
- it:Monastier di Treviso
