= Fenouillet, Haute-Garonne =

Fenouillet Fenolhet (Occitan)
- Commune
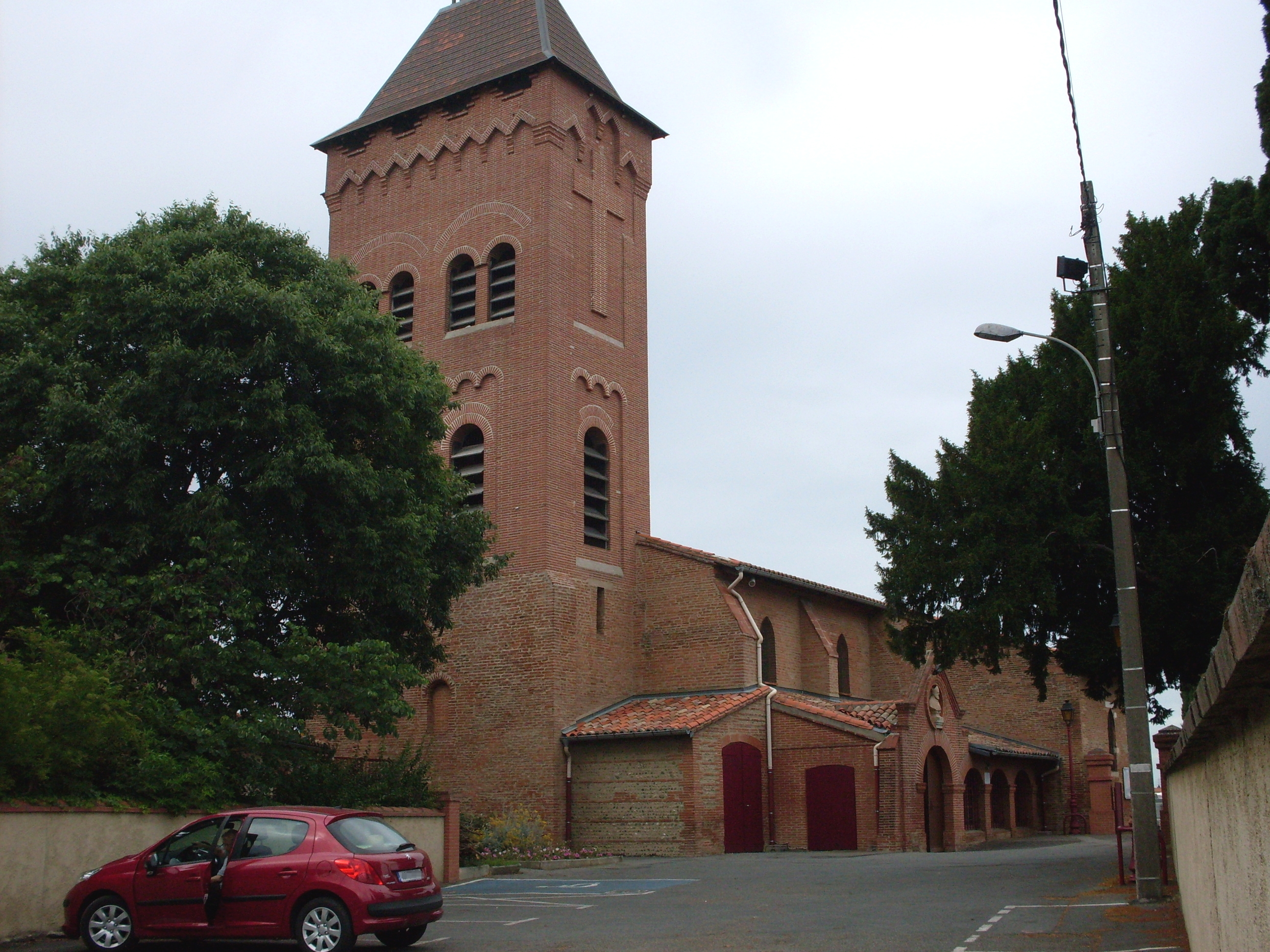
- The church in Fenouillet

- Coat of arms
- Location of Fenouillet
- Location within France Location within Occitanie
- Coordinates: 43°40′51″N 1°23′41″E
- Country: France
- Region: Occitania
- Department: Haute-Garonne
- Arrondissement: Toulouse
- Canton: Castelginest
- Intercommunality: Toulouse Métropole

Government
  - Mayor (2020–2026): Thierry Duhamel
- Area^{1}: 9.51 km^{2} (3.67 sq mi)
- Elevation: 125 m (410 ft)
- Highest elevation: 129 m (423 ft)
- Lowest elevation: 115 m (377 ft)
- Population (2023): 5,784
  - Density: 608/km^{2} (1,580/sq mi)
- Time zone: UTC+01:00 (CET)
  - Summer (DST): UTC+02:00 (CEST)
- INSEE/Postal code: 31182 /31150
- ^{1} French Land Register data, which excludes lakes, ponds, glaciers > 1 km^{2} (0.386 sq mi or 247 acres) and river estuaries.

Fenouillet (French pronunciation: [fənujɛ]; Occitan: Fenolhet) is a commune in the Haute-Garonne department in southwestern France.

== Population ==
Historical population
Year	Pop.	±% p.a.
1968	2,133	—
1975	2,954	+4.76%
1982	2,928	−0.13%
1990	3,426	+1.98%
1999	4,028	+1.81%
2007	4,898	+2.47%
2012	5,121	+0.89%
2017	5,161	+0.16%
2023	5,784	+1.92%
Source: INSEE

== See also ==
- Communes of the Haute-Garonne department
