= Porto di Po di Goro Lighthouse =

Porto di Po di Goro
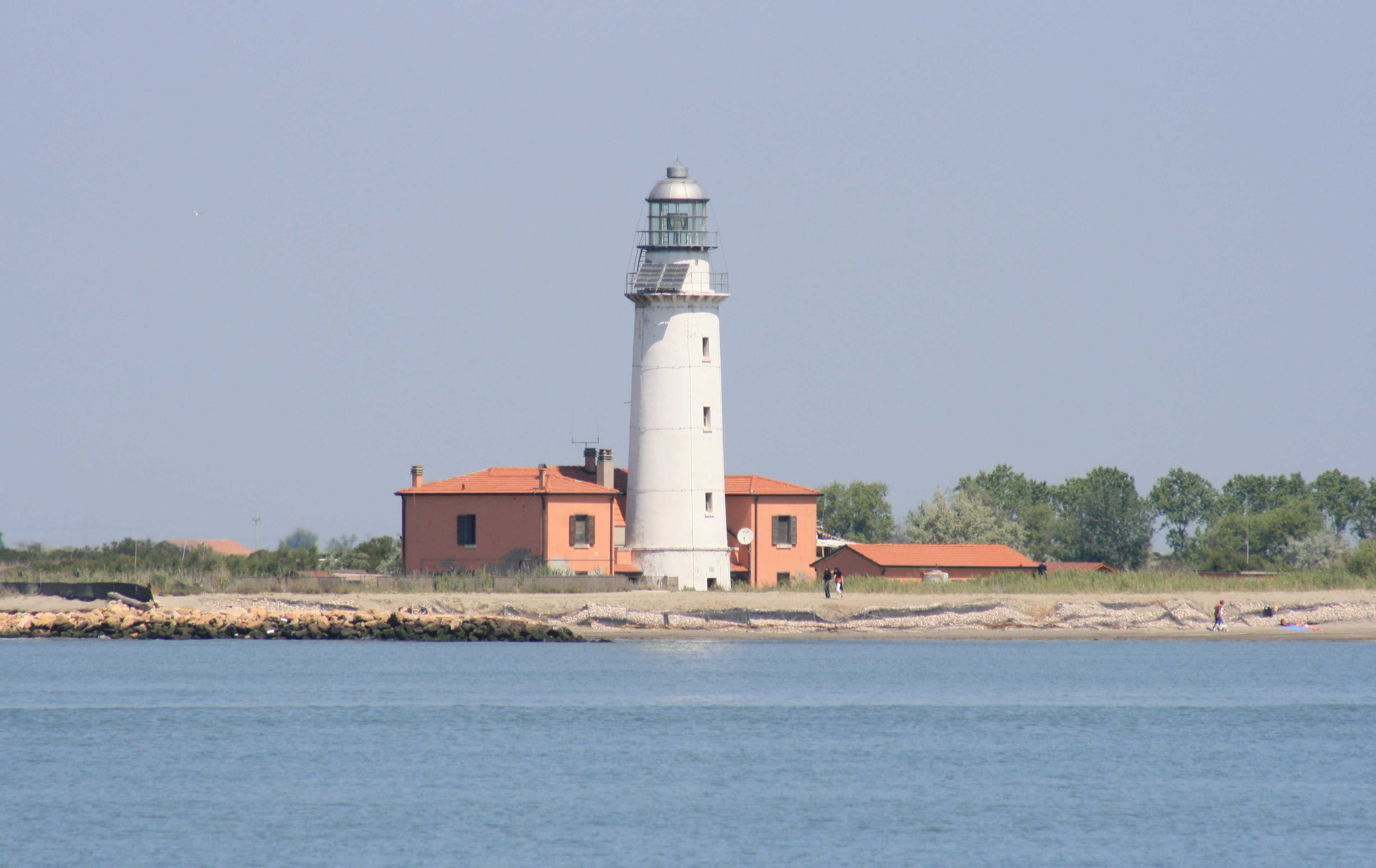
- Porto di Po di Goro Lighthouse
- Location: Goro; Emilia-Romagna; Italy
- Coordinates: 44°47′29″N 12°23′48″E

Tower
- Constructed: 1862 (first)
- Construction: masonry tower
- Automated: yes
- Height: 17 metres (56 ft)
- Shape: cylindrical tower with balcony and lantern attached to a 2-storey keeper's house
- Markings: white tower, red bricks keeper's house, grey metallic lantern dome
- Power source: mains electricity
- Operator: Marina Militare

Light
- First lit: 1950
- Deactivated: 1950 (first)
- Focal height: 18 metres (59 ft)
- Lens: Type TD 1000; Focal length: 500 mm
- Intensity: main: AL 1000 W reserve LABI 100 W
- Range: main: 17 nautical miles (31 km; 20 mi) reserve: 13 nautical miles (24 km; 15 mi)
- Characteristic: Fl (2) W 10s.
- Italy no.: 4072 E.F.

Porto di Po di Goro Lighthouse (Italian: Faro di Porto di Po di Goro) is an active lighthouse located on the Isola dell'Amore on the Adriatic Sea, the northernmost place in Emilia-Romagna to the border with Veneto, on the delta of Po river.

== Description ==
The first lighthouse was built in 1865 near the mouth of the Po river, but the progressive fluvial deposit turned away from the sea; today this lighthouse has been recovered and used as a birdwatching observatory. The old lighthouse was replaced by another which was destroyed in 1945 from the retreating German troops. The current lighthouse was built in 1950 and consists of a 2-storey red bricks keeper's house; the tower, 10 feet (3.0 m) high, with balcony and lantern is attached to the seaward side keeper's house. The lighthouse until 1985 was painted with red and white horizontal bands and utilised as day-mark. The lantern, painted in white and the dome in grey metallic, is positioned at 18 metres (59 ft) above sea level and emits two white flashes in a 10 seconds period, visible up to a distance of 17 nautical miles (31 km; 20 mi). The lighthouse is completely automated and operated by the Marina Militare with the identification code number 4072 E.F.

== See also ==
- List of lighthouses in Italy
- Goro
