= Bosaro =

- Comune
- Comune di Bosaro
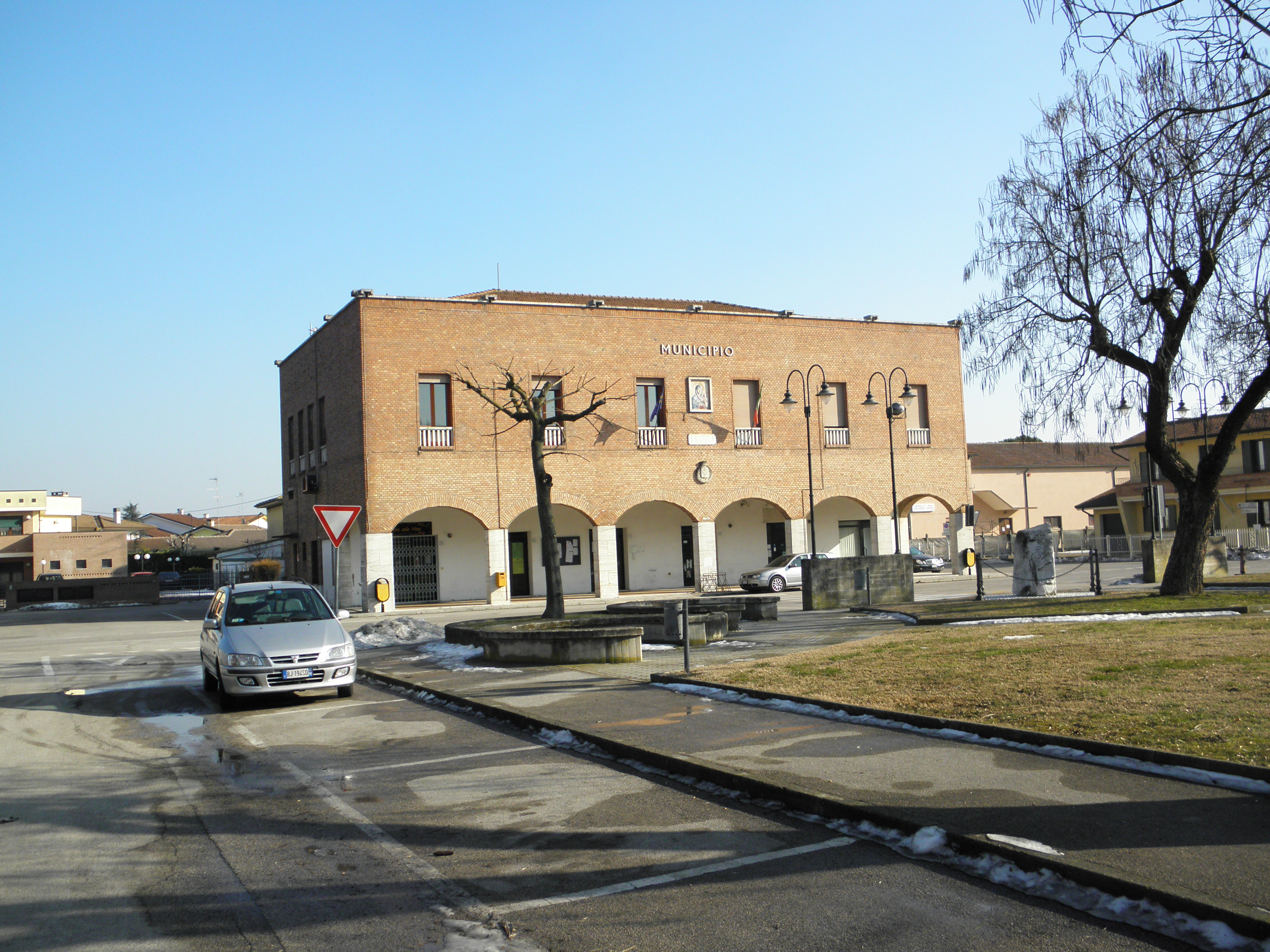
- Madonna San Luca Square in front of Town Hall

- Location within Italy Location within Veneto
- Coordinates: 45°0′N 11°46′E
- Country: Italy
- Region: Veneto
- Province: Rovigo (RO)

Government
  - Mayor: Daniele Panella

Area
  - Total: 6.12 km^{2} (2.36 sq mi)
- Elevation: 3 m (9.8 ft)

Population (30 April 2017)
  - Total: 1,479
  - Density: 242/km^{2} (626/sq mi)
- Demonym: Bosaresi
- Time zone: UTC+1 (CET)
  - Summer (DST): UTC+2 (CEST)
- Postal code: 45033
- Dialing code: 0425
- Website: Official website

Bosaro is a comune (municipality) in the Province of Rovigo in the Italian region Veneto, located about 60 kilometres (37 mi) southwest of Venice and about 8 kilometres (5 mi) south of Rovigo.

Bosaro borders the following municipalities: Arquà Polesine, Guarda Veneta, Polesella, Pontecchio Polesine, Rovigo.

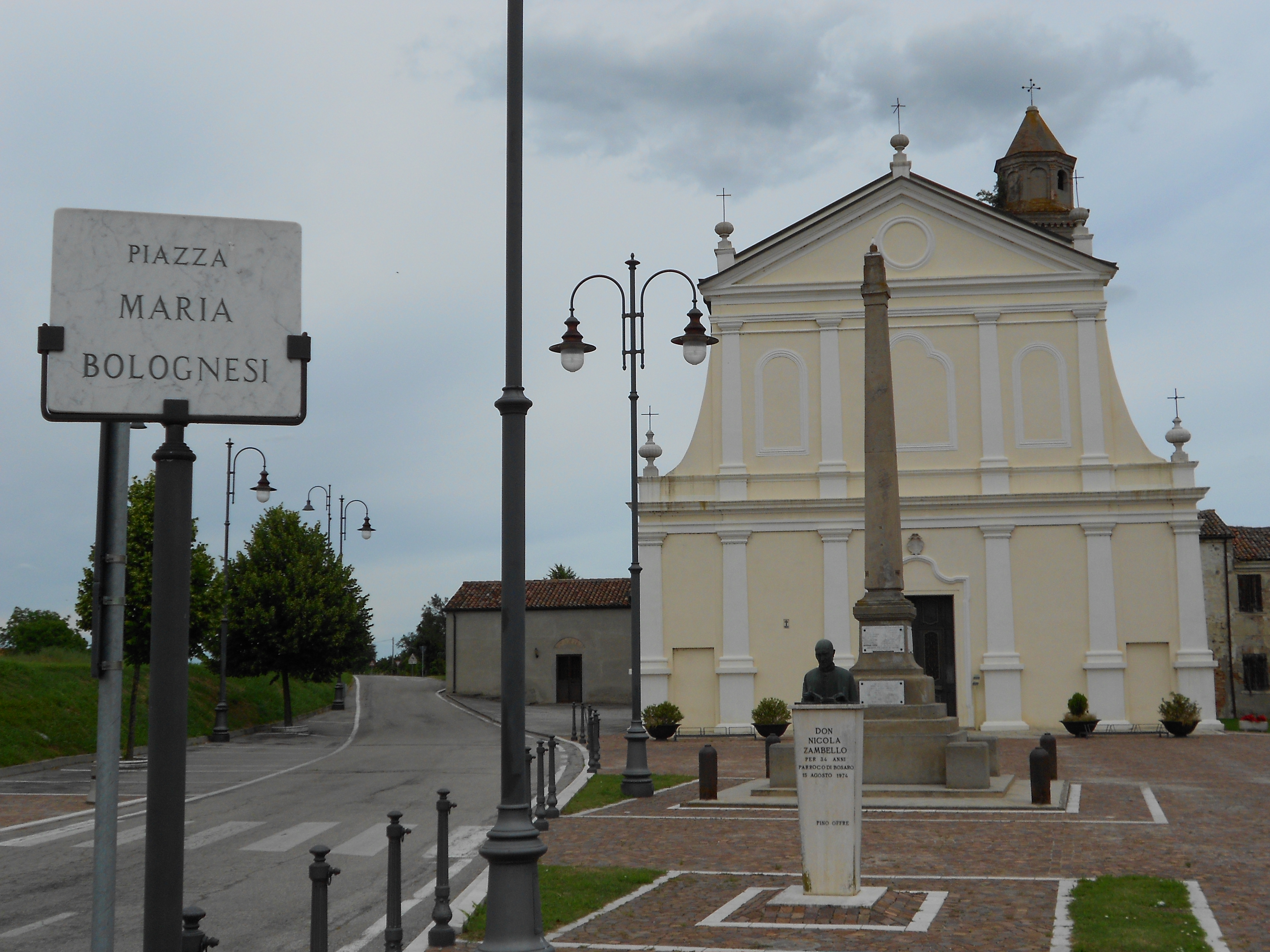
Maria Bolognesi square
