= Guarda Veneta =

- Comune
- Comune di Guarda Veneta
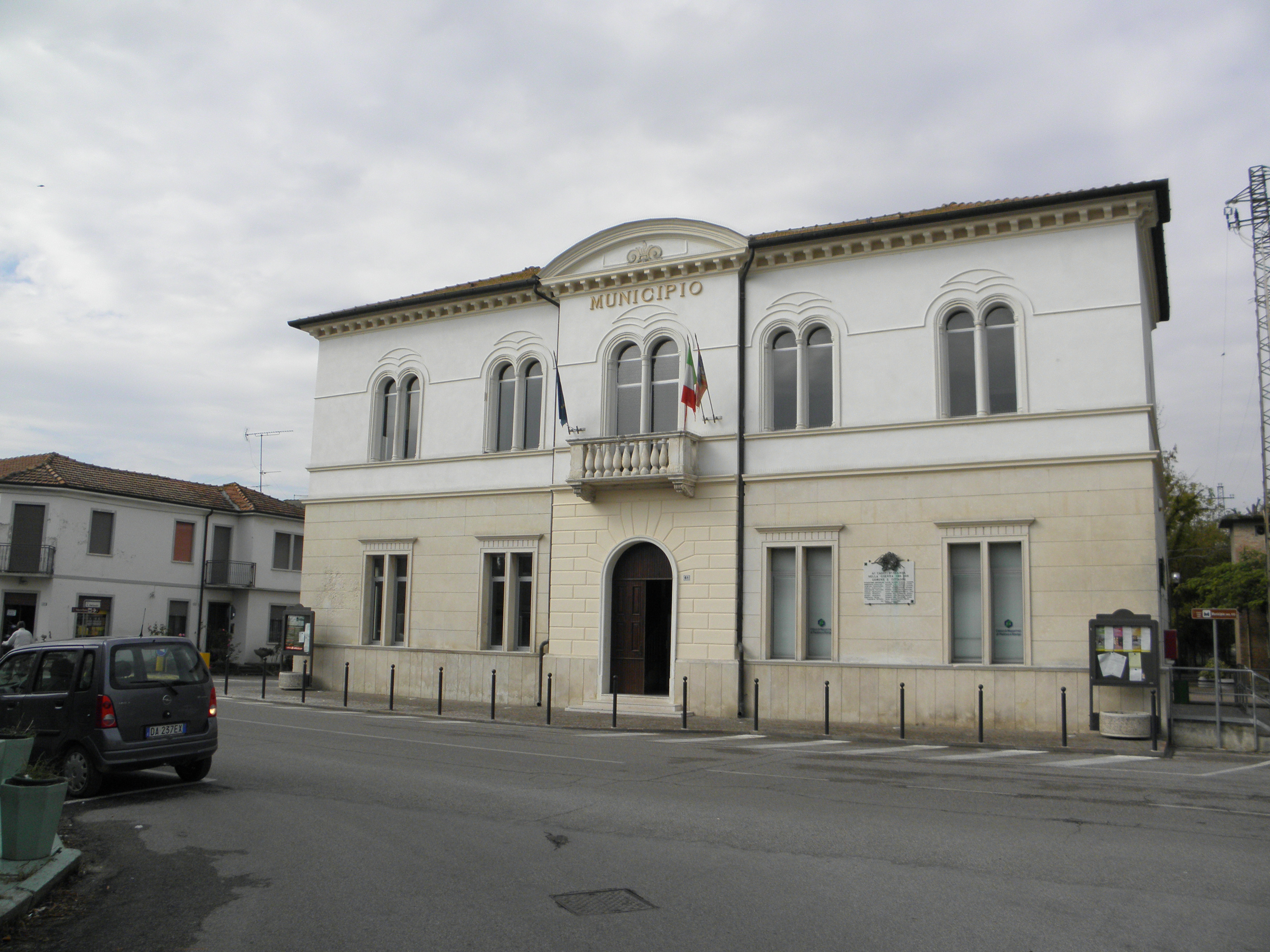
- Guarda Veneta town hall

- Location within Italy Location within Veneto
- Coordinates: 44°59′N 11°48′E
- Country: Italy
- Region: Veneto
- Province: Rovigo (RO)

Government
  - Mayor: Erminio Colò

Area
  - Total: 17.21 km^{2} (6.64 sq mi)
- Elevation: 5 m (16 ft)

Population (31 August 2017)
  - Total: 1,127
  - Density: 65.49/km^{2} (169.6/sq mi)
- Demonym: Guardensi
- Time zone: UTC+1 (CET)
  - Summer (DST): UTC+2 (CEST)
- Postal code: 45030
- Dialing code: 0425
- Website: Official website

Guarda Veneta is a comune (municipality) in the Province of Rovigo in the Italian region of Veneto, located about 60 kilometres (37 mi) southwest of Venice and about 9 kilometres (6 mi) south of Rovigo.

Guarda Veneta borders the following municipalities: Bosaro, Crespino, Polesella, Pontecchio Polesine, Ro.
