= Maria Bolognesi =

Italian mystic (1924–1980)

Blessed Maria Bolognesi
- Born: 21 October 1924; Bosaro, Rovigo, Kingdom of Italy
- Died: 30 January 1980 (aged 56); Bosaro, Rovigo, Italy
- Venerated in: Roman Catholic Church
- Beatified: 7 September 2013, Piazza XX Settembre, Rovigo, Italy & Our Lady of The Rosary of San Nicolas Parish Church, Magdalena, Laguna by Cardinal Angelo Amato
- Major shrine: Our Lady of Walsingham Parish Church, San Pablo City, Laguna
- Feast: 30 January

Maria Bolognesi (21 October 1924 – 30 January 1980) was an Italian Catholic. Throughout her life she suffered from debilitating diseases and was reportedly subject to various demonic possessions and visions. Her numerous visions were of Jesus Christ and through him saw Heaven while also receiving the stigmata herself.

Bolognesi was beatified on 7 September 2013; Cardinal Angelo Amato presided over the beatification on the behalf of Pope Francis. The cause opened under Pope John Paul II in 1992 while Pope Benedict XVI had named her as Venerable in mid-2012.

== Life ==
Maria Bolognesi was born as Maria Semiolo on 21 October 1924 in Rovigo to Giuseppe Samiolo. Her natural father - himself illegitimate - did not want to wed her mother and split from her which left Bolognesi to live until 1929 in her mother's home with her mother's name. Her maternal grandmother Cornetto Cesira was perhaps the most influential individual in her childhood in terms of instilling in the girl a religious education and love for God. Bolognesi received the name of her stepfather after her mother married Giuseppe Bolognesi in 1930; the pair went to live with him at San Cassiano. Her step-grandfather was Luigi Bolognesi.

In 1932 she ran a high fever and her mother at the same time had contracted meningitis and was on her deathbed. Bolognesi had begun to prepare for her First Communion at this time and the nun that was instructing her at the time told her that Jesus Christ would grant her a wish. She wished that her mother would recover and she did; Bolognesi went on to make her First Communion on 22 May 1932 with much emotion.

Her stepfather often beat her mother due to his somewhat abrasive nature. Their son Luigi was born on 21 June 1940. In summer 1940 Maria began to experience what were considered diabolical attacks. She could not enter a church, the blessings of priests failing to have an effect on her. Bolognesi was taken to a mental hospital for evaluation but the Bishop of Rovigo Guido Maria Mazzocco blessed her from the window of his residence before she was taken there. The doctors did not note any psychological disorder.

She grew up in a poor household and was able to attend only the first and second grade of school. Her peers often marginalized her. She dropped out of school as a child and worked as an agricultural laborer in order to help support her family.

Bolognesi received her first vision of Jesus Christ on the evening of Holy Thursday, April 1, 1942. In the vision the Lord assured her that she would learn how to read and bestowed on her a ruby ring, a symbol of the stigmata. Her spiritual director at this time was the priest Bassiano Paiato, who advised her to keep a spiritual diary.

In April 1942 she began to wear a black habit with the express permission of Paiato. She was ridiculed for her piety. By January 1944, she had moved to the house of a Mrs. Piva. She had another vision during which Christ gave her the gift of sweating blood, which happened every Friday at 3:00 p.m.

In March 1948 three male criminals attacked her, knocking her unconscious. She was left injured in the snow.Because people were skeptical of this the police sergeant took her to the magistrate and accused her of having faked the account though she was later absolved of these charges in October.

During the 1940s she began to suffer from arthritis as well as colitis and appendicitis while almost becoming blind in 1950. In July, she moved to Rovigo. For treatment she would often have to go to Padua. Her new spiritual director from June 1951 was Rodolfo Barbieri.

She returned to Rovigo and began her mission of looking after orphans and making frequent visits to the sick in hospitals. In July 1951 she suffered the pain of the Lord's flagellation. In August 1954 she resided with some Augustinian nuns in Ferrara. She was hospitalized in February 1955 and had a vision telling her to leave Rovigo. She went to a spiritual retreat in Sperlinga in April 1955. En route back home from Sperlinga she stopped at San Giovanni Rotondo where she had a fever and her shoes full of blood. She found an inn and remained there and had a vision of Christ on Good Friday 8 April 1955.

Mgr. Adelino Marenga became her spiritual director in September 1956. In spring 1958 Bolognesi was bedridden until 1959. Upon Marenga's death in 1964 and her spiritual director became Aldo Balduin. Bolognesi suffered a heart attack in 1971 and her health continued to decline. She died of a heart attack on 30 January 1980 at 2:00am and her remains were later transferred to the parish of Bosaro.

== Beatification ==
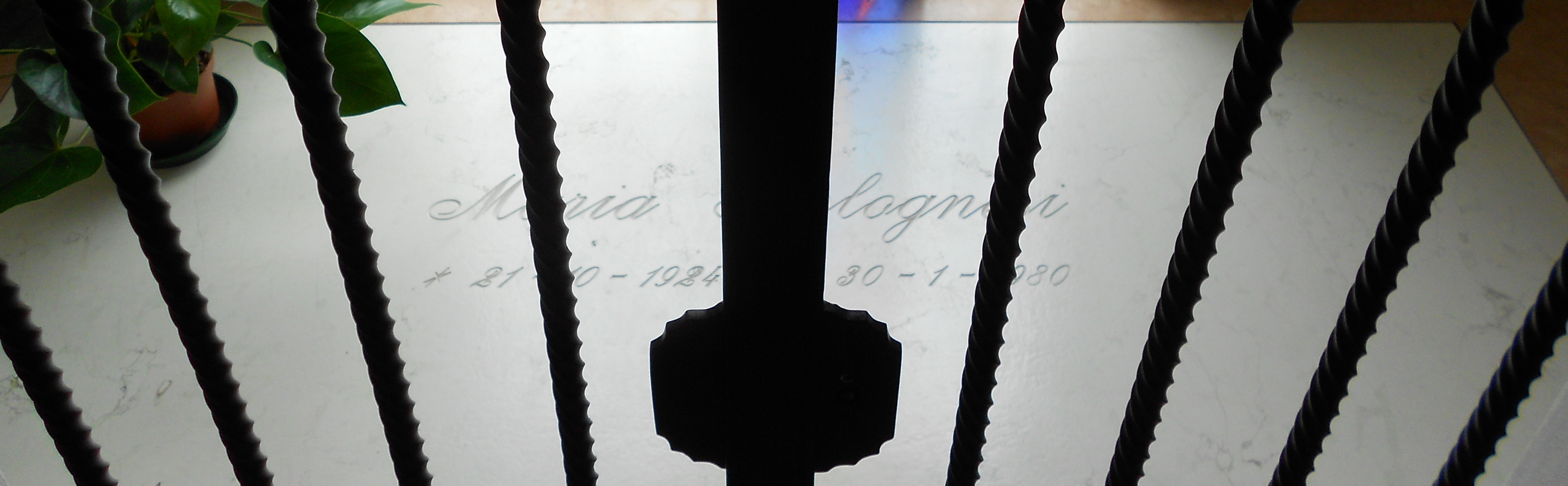
Bolognesi's tomb in Rovigo.

The beatification process opened under Pope John Paul II on 18 February 1992 in which she was titled as a Servant of God after the Congregation for the Causes of Saints issued the official "nihil obstat" to the cause in which it allowed for it to open on a diocesan level. The diocesan process opened on 21 October 1992 and concluded its work on 8 July 2000 before the C.C.S. validated the process in Rome on 25 May 2001 and received the official Positio dossier from the postulation later in 2007.

The board of theologians met on two occasions on 19 February 2010 - in which another meeting was requested to discuss her writings and religious experiences - and on 24 June 2011 when definitive approval for the cause was issued. The C.C.S. met on 6 March 2012 and also approved the cause. On 10 May 2012 she was proclaimed to be Venerable after Pope Benedict XVI confirmed that she had lived a model Christian life of heroic virtue.

The process for the miracle required for beatification was investigated - the healing of a man named Marco - from 23 September 2004 until 13 December 2005 and was issued validation on 18 May 2007 before receiving the approval of a medical board on 5 July 2012; theologians also approved this miracle on 17 November 2012 as did the C.C.S. on 9 April 2013. Pope Francis issued the final approval needed to the miracle - and her beatification - on 2 May 2013. Bolognesi was beatified in Rovigo on 7 September 2013 and Cardinal Angelo Amato presided on the pope's behalf.

The current postulator assigned to the cause is Raffaele Talmelli.
