= Adelmo Landini =

Italian inventor

Adelmo Landini (1896; Pontecchio di Sasso Marconi, Bologna – August 1965), was an Italian inventor, pupil and assistant of Guglielmo Marconi. He was also an inventor in his own right, devising and developing various mechanical devices and others in the field of radio.

Landini graduated from Bologna with a technical qualification and served in the Great War as a signaller (telegraphist) in the engineering branch of the Italian army. During his military service he was awarded two medals and a commendation.

In 1927 he became the radio officer and technical assistant of Marconi on the yacht, Elettra. It was a lucky coincidence that he came from Pontecchio, a place near Marconi's home and where the latter had conducted his early experiments. Recalling his interview, Landini later commented, "When I told Marconi that I was from Pontecchio, and that I'd seen him in 1904, he was moved and we went on to exchange a few words in the local dialect." Landini continued as Marconi's radio officer on the yacht until 1931 when he left following an accident.

He set himself up in Genoa and continued to experiment in the field on his own account. He lodged seven patents including one described as 'an apparatus for an automatic aiming device for the progressive positioning of one or more microwave beams onto the surface of the Moon for communication purposes, including that of long distance television'. This 'Moon bounce' phenomenon was first observed by Landini on 27 July 1930 in the radio laboratory on Elettra while she was in port at Civitavecchia. He was receiving wireless telegraphy at about 19.00 hours from Rio de Janeiro on a wavelength of 14 metres when he suddenly noticed that the signals became distorted; moreover, there was a clearly defined delay – an echo of about two seconds. He hurried to fetch Marconi, who listened carefully and discounted any other possibility before coming up with the right answer. "There's no doubt about it. The echo must be caused by reflection from a body in space – to be precise from the moon. Two seconds would be the time for a wave to travel to the moon and back. The moon reflects electro-magnetic waves in the same way that it reflects light." The above was recorded by Landini in his book Navigando con Marconi a bordo dello yacht Elettra ('Sailing with Marconi on board the yacht Elettra'). And so was born the concept of using the Moon as a reflector, thus facilitating communication via microwaves, which at that time were considered to be of a wavelength of one metre or less. It was along these lines that Landini carried out pioneering experiments in 1938/1939 and lodged his own patent, details of which were published on 13 July 1949 in an article in the periodical, Avvenire d'Italia, the translated title of the article being, 'The extraordinary invention of a pupil of Marconi'.

Landini became a writer, publishing articles and memoirs of his time with Marconi. His large collection of mementoes and technical documents of the period was gradually sold off to finance his struggling business.

Long omitted from the official history of Marconi, Landini was rediscovered in 1995 during the centenary celebrations organized by the Comitato Guglielmo Marconi for the birth of radio. The town of Sasso Marconi named a street in his honour in the Pontecchio district, where he was born.

== Translation ==
The above is a translation, with additional citations, of the article on the Italian Wikipedia at
