= Romualdo Rossi =

- Born: 1877; Goro, Emilia–Romagna, Italy
- Died: 1968 (aged 90–91); Rome, Italy
- Occupations: Writer, journalist, editor

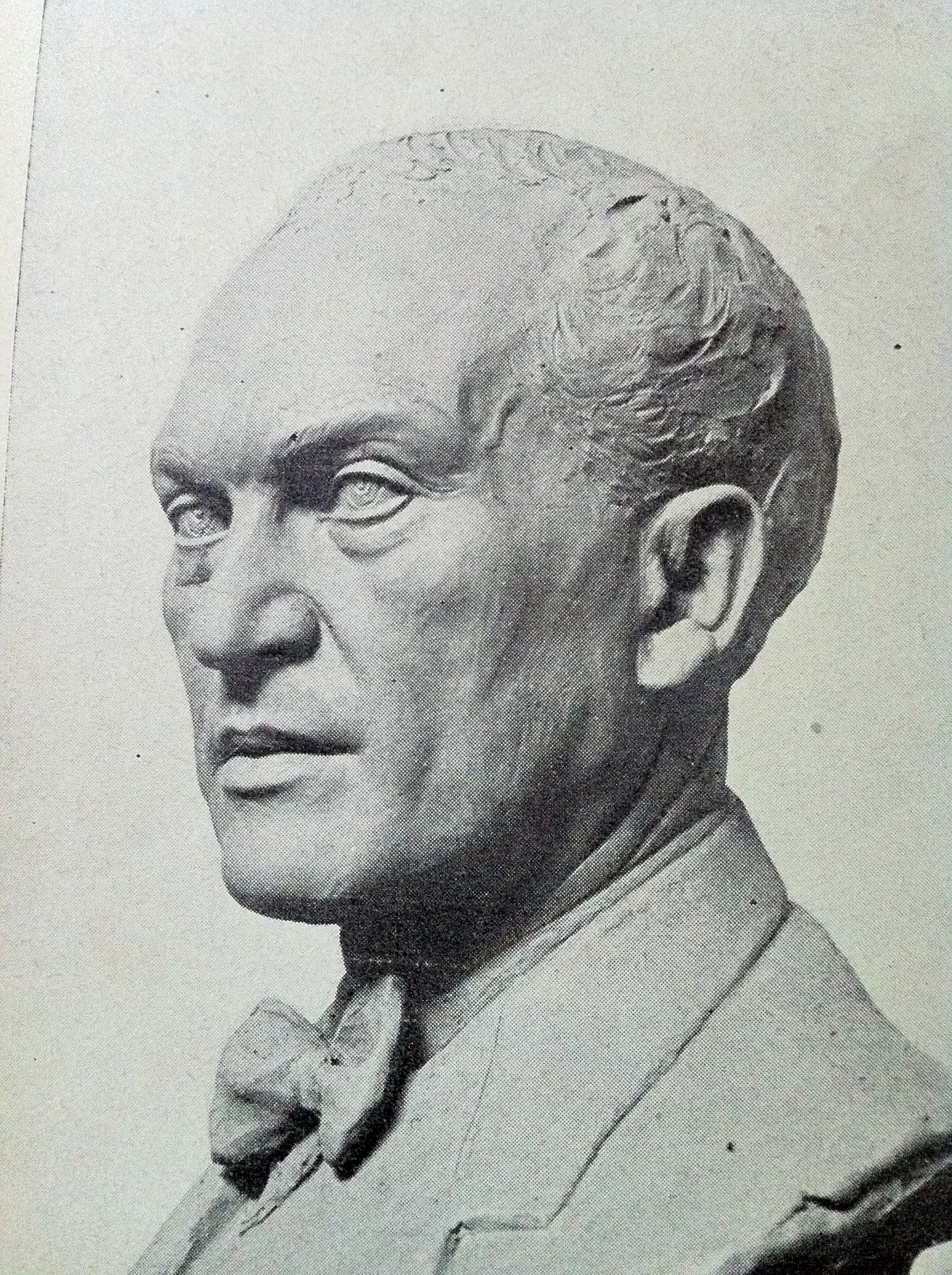
Marble bust depicting Romualdo Rossi

Born in Goro Ferrarese to Luigi and Caterina Branchi, Romualdo Rossi (1877-1968) was initially close to and a personal friend of Benito Mussolini. However, he did not shy away from criticising Mussolini’s positions, especially prior to Italy’s entry into the war, opposing the xenophobic stance of Nazi Germany. He co-founded and contributed to publications aligned with the syndicalist and socialist movements.

He was highly active on the syndicalist front, particularly in Gorizia’s factories, within the fascist union, where he highlighted workers’ rights and the necessity of enforcing regulations. In 1924, he organised workers’ assemblies, openly contesting the Brunner group, who opposed the application of the labour contract.

Among the various publications he contributed to was L’Internazionale, the official organ of the “Revolutionary Syndicalist” Labour Chamber of Parma, which was later also published in Bologna and Milan. He founded Diana with Italo Balbo and former socialist Renato Castelfranchi. In 1913, Balbo wrote an article in Rossi’s defence after Rossi was sentenced to nine months of confinement for criticising the Savoy monarchy. In the article, Balbo criticised the bourgeoisie for its oppression of the proletariat, demonstrating his commitment to the syndicalist cause and his opposition to monarchist institutions. For Balbo, Rossi represented a symbol of the struggle against social injustices and opposition to established power, influencing the young Balbo’s path in political activism.

Among other publications, Rossi also directed La Scintilla and the journal Italia - U.R.S.S. e Oriente. Rassegna commerciale mensile, published in 1930, as well as the weekly L’Italia del lavoro. Giornale politico di critica e di battaglia.

One of his most famous works is Mussolini nudo alla meta, written in 1944. It seems that the phrase “naked at the finish line” was actually coined by Mussolini himself in 1923. Following Italy’s acquisition of the Dodecanese Islands, Mussolini disdainfully refused the title of Duke of Rhodes, considering it pointless and meaningless. Mussolini intended to express that he required nothing and no one to reach his objective.

== Works ==
- Rappresaglia fascista e Fascismo, 9 Aprile 1921, Roma
- Mazzini e il fascismo: sintesi critica e polemica / Romualdo Rossi; prefazione di Emilio Settimelli, Livorno: Massima editrice, stampa 1931
- Briciole di Filosofia rivoluzionaria, Roma: Casa Editr. Pinciana, 1932 (Ind. Tip. Romana)
- Filippo Corridoni: tribuno del popolo, Roma: Pianciana, 1933
- La bilancia de l'osservatore romano, Roma: Ideal, 1934 (Tip. F.lli Pallotta)
- Note polemiche sul Mazzini (di Nazzareno Mezzetti) - Casa Editrice Pinciana, Roma 1934
- Eresie di un rivoluzionario": L'Intransigente, 1935
- Ai margini della rivoluzione" Roma: Pattuglia Nera, 1936
- Il fuoco" Roma: Ed. di Pattuglia nera, 1939
- L'ora della Chiesa, Roma: Ed. Di Pattuglia Nera, 1942 (Tip. U. Quintily).
- Mussolini nudo alla meta, Roma, 1944
- Compendio di legislazione per I candidati ai concorsi magistrali: Ordinamento dello Stato italiano e della scuola elementare. Stato giuridico dei Maestri, Firenze: F. Le Monnier, 1951 (Tip. E. Ariani e L'arte Della Stampa)
- Evoluzione del sindacalismo: Da Karl Marx a Giuseppe Mazzini. Prefazione di Raffaele Passaretti. Giudizi di Giulietti e Del Fante, Roma: Ed. Di parlamento, 1956 (Tip. Babuino)
- Evoluzione del sindacalismo: Da Karl Marx a Giuseppe Mazzini. Roma: Ediz. di Parlamento, 1956
- L'Europa al bivio / Romualdo Rossi, Roma: Pallotta, 1964
