= Elettra (1904 ship) =

1904 steam yacht

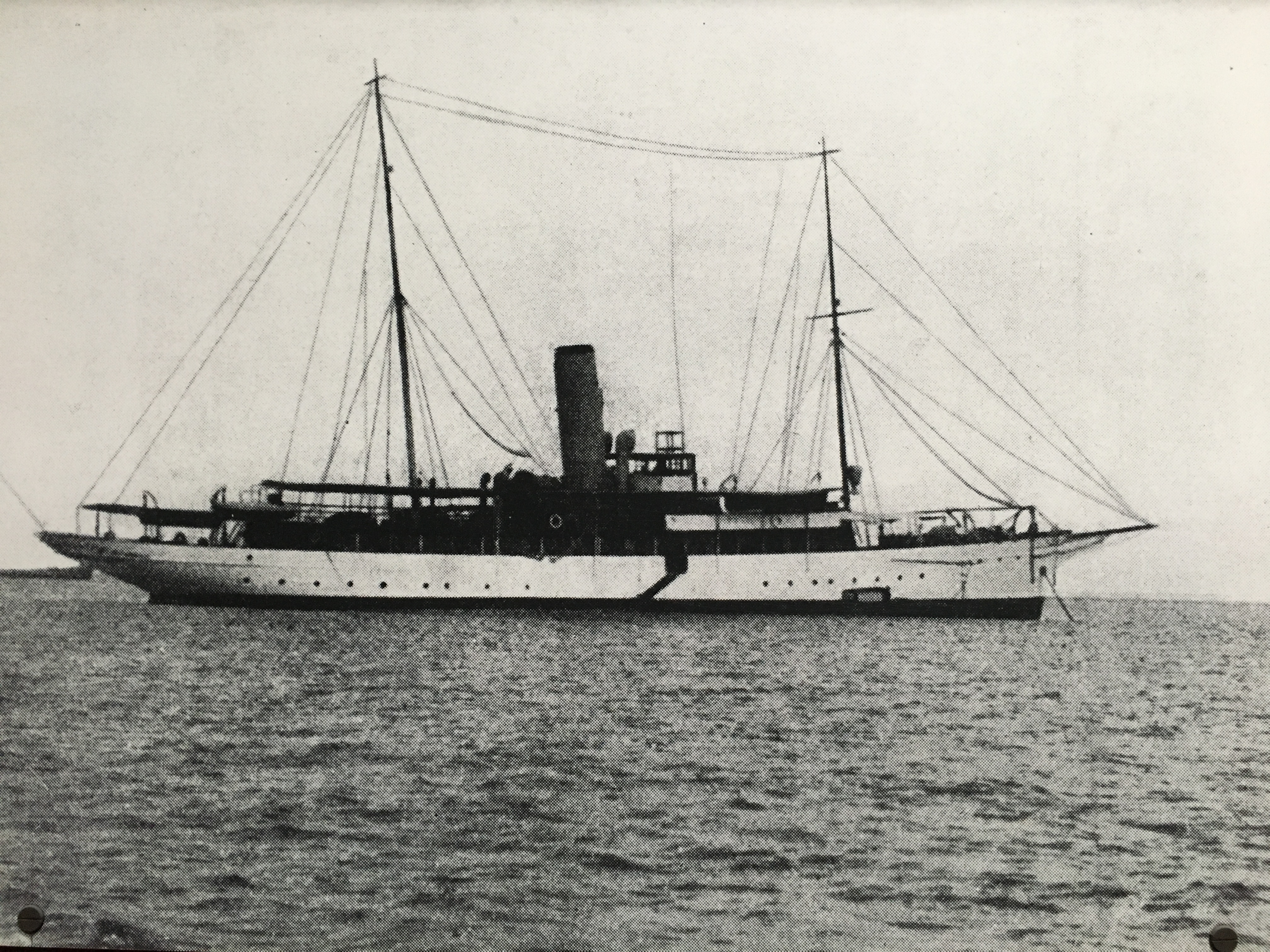
- Elettra

History
- Name: Rovenska
- Owner: Archduke Charles Stephen of Austria
- Builder: Ramage & Ferguson, Leith, Scotland
- Launched: 27 March 1904
- Home port: Lussingrande
- Identification: HVNR

United Kingdom
- Name: Rovenska
- Owner: Max Waechter
- Acquired: 1909

United Kingdom
- Name: Rovenska
- Owner: Gustav HF Pratt
- Acquired: 1914

United Kingdom
- Name: Rovenska
- Owner: Royal Navy – patrol & escort duties
- Route: Between England and ports of Brest and Saint Malo
- Acquired: 1914

Italy
- Name: Elettra
- Owner: Guglielmo Marconi
- Route: Worldwide
- Acquired: 1919 for conversion to seaborne laboratory
- Home port: Genoa
- Identification: Code letters and radio callsign IBDK

Greater German Reich
- Name: G-107, NA-6
- Acquired: Requisitioned 1943 by German Kriegsmarine
- Fate: 22 Jan 1944 Destroyed at Diklo near Zadar by allied fighter-bombers

Elettra was Guglielmo Marconi's steam yacht – a seaborne laboratory – from which he conducted his many experiments with wireless telegraphy, wireless telephony and other communication and direction-finding techniques during the inter-war period.

== History ==
Built during the early part of the 20th century, she sailed both as a private yacht and also as a naval patrol boat before passing into the hands of Guglielmo Marconi in 1919.

=== Yacht ===
The vessel was built in the shipyards of Ramage & Ferguson of Leith, Scotland, having been designed by the engineering firm of Cox and King of London. She was launched on behalf of Archduke Charles Stephen of Austria under the name of Rovenska on 27 March 1904. However, the vessel herself was invoiced to his wife, the Archduchess Maria Theresa of Austria. The name was derived from Rovenska on the Adriatic island of Lošinj off the coast of what is now Croatia, a favourite spot of the archduke and the site of his luxurious villa. She sailed under the flag of the Austro-Hungarian Empire until 1909 but was then sold to Sir Max Waechter for £26,000, at which point she sailed under the British flag while still retaining her original name. During this ownership it is likely that she undertook two main voyages: one to the Adriatic and the Black Sea and another to the North Sea. In 1914 she was sold to the industrialist, Gustav HF Pratt.

== Service during the Great War ==
=== Patrol vessel ===
At the outbreak of World War I, the vessel was requisitioned by the British government and converted into a patrol and escort ship for the Royal Navy as part of the Channel Fleet, plying between England and the French ports of Brest and Saint Malo. At the end of the war, she was decommissioned and auctioned at Southampton, coming into the hands of Guglielmo Marconi in 1919 for £21,000.

== Service with Marconi ==
=== Conversion to luxurious seaborne laboratory ===
Now owned by Marconi, the vessel sailed from London in July 1919. Off the coast of Portugal, Marconi startled the operators at a coast station with transmissions of music from gramophone records. The yacht arrived at Naples in mid-August, then transferring to La Spezia, where she was converted for service as a laboratory.

Marconi's original intention was to rename his yacht Scintilla ('Spark') but it was felt this would prove too difficult to pronounce in English. The yacht was accordingly renamed Elettra and was entered into the Italian Registry of Shipping on 27 October 1921 with subsequent ratification under the Italian flag on 21 December. Modifications at La Spezia included increasing the height of the masts in order to rig the various wireless aerials that would be required. It was also arranged that Marconi's private cabin would give directly onto the laboratory. On deck and aft of the laboratory was a dining room with space at table for 12–14 diners. Further aft still was a large and well-appointed saloon complete with a piano. The vessel soon became famous and known in Italian as La nave dei miracoli ('the ship of miracles'). While sailing across the Bay of Biscay in April 1920 an interesting 'first' was established – guests danced in the saloon to broadcast music coming from the ballroom of the Savoy Hotel in London. Later, on 15 June, the voice of the famous soprano Nellie Melba was heard at a distance of 2000 miles during a broadcast from the Marconi transmitting station at Chelmsford in England.

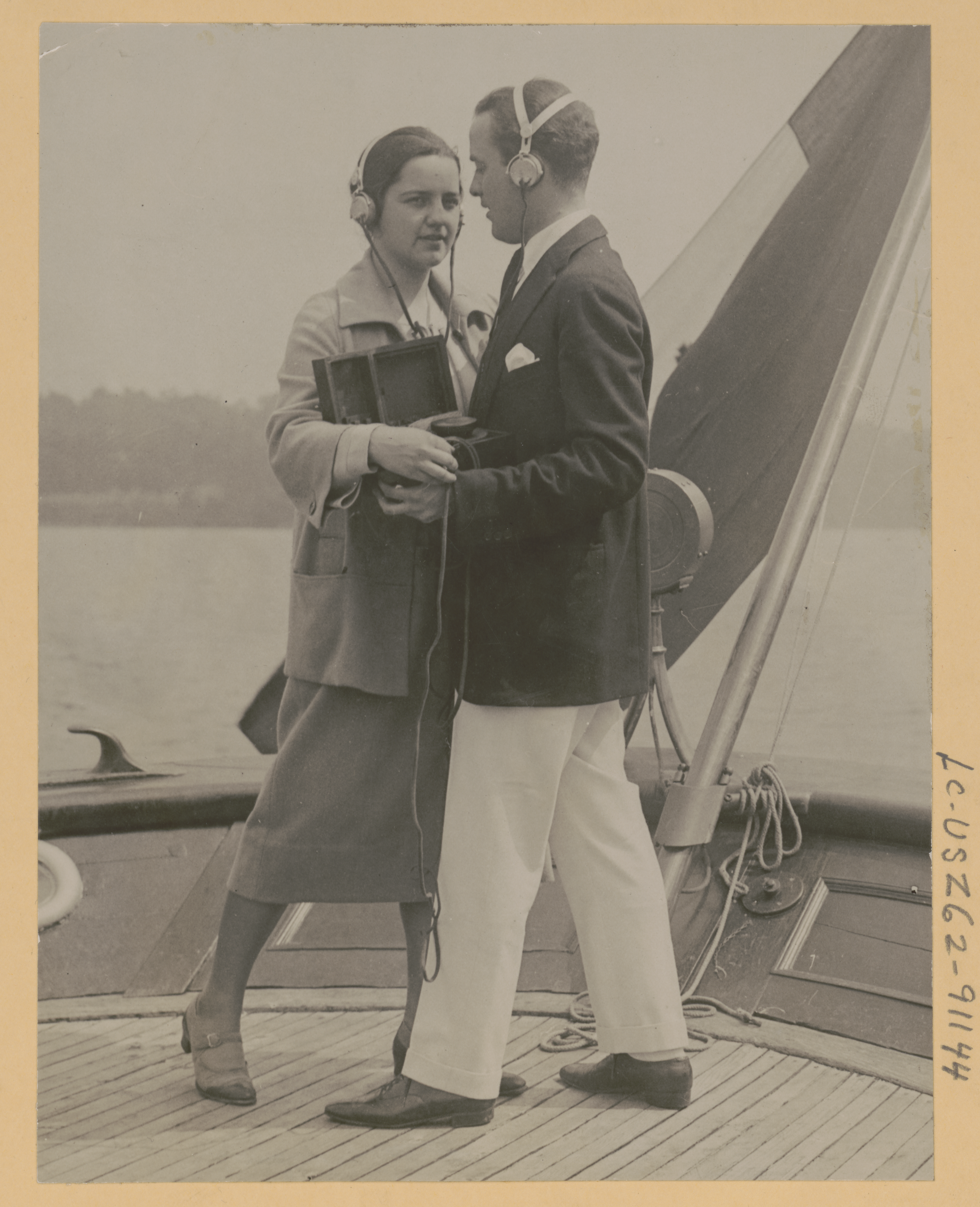
Everything is radio on Marconi's yacht – a "personal dance" on board the palatial vessel while on the trip to Albany Showing Josephine Young of Riverside, Conn., and J.W. Elwood of New York, LCCN96512883

=== Visitors on board ===
The luxurious accommodation was deemed necessary to impress distinguished guests – these would later include King Victor Emmanuel III of Italy and King George V of the United Kingdom. In September 1920 another guest on board was Marconi's friend, the Italian poet and nationalist Gabriele D'Annunzio. Elettra had put in at the port of Fiume (now Rijeka) in an unofficial attempt by Marconi to persuade D'Annunzio to drop his demands for that city to become part of Italy. Marconi allowed him to use the ship's transmitter, whereupon D'Annunzio made an impassioned speech to the world in which he urged Italy to annexe the territory. On 31 March 1930 Benito Mussolini visited the yacht when she was lying off Fiumicino. This was followed with another visit in June 1930 when she was off Ostia. Mussolini, who was greatly interested in long distance wireless telegraphy and telephony, expressed a wish to be put through to London and communication was made via the Marconi wireless station, with its receivers at Bridgeport and transmitters and beam aerials at Dorchester in Dorset. This formed part of the Imperial Wireless Chain that linked London with the British Empire. He had hoped to speak to Sir Basil Blackett but the latter was unavailable and so he conversed for a while with an operator at the station, commenting later on the clarity of the speech.

=== Crew ===
With a crew of some 30, Elettra was able to sail long distances without needing to refuel; in 1922 she first crossed the Atlantic to New York, surviving the effects of a severe storm. An important crew member was the radio officer, Adelmo Landini, who was known as the 'marconista', the Italian term equivalent to 'sparks' in English. Landini, who sailed with Marconi from 1927 to 1931, had been a wireless operator decorated for gallantry in the army during the Great War. He was not only a skilled Morse code operator but also a self-taught expert in wireless technology. As such he not only assumed the duties of the yacht's radio officer but also assisted Marconi with his experiments. Indeed Landini later became an experimenter and inventor in his own right, registering seven patents for his inventions. In 1938/39, he registered a patent concerning the bouncing of radio waves off the surface of the Moon – a phenomenon that he had first become aware of while serving on Elettra. In 1931 while the vessel was en route from Cannes to Santa Margherita Ligure, Landini lost his balance during bad weather and brushed against a high tension cable. Following this accident he left Elettra and did not return to work with Marconi.

=== Marconi's reflections on the advantages of a seaborne laboratory ===
Without Elettra it would have been impossible to carry out my experiments in the Mediterranean and in the Atlantic; I would not have been able to continue and develop my research into short wave transmissions. With my seaborne laboratory – unique in the world – I have been able to realise my dreams. For example, how to beam (direct) a radio signal and to use radio for navigational purposes. This yacht has not only made me independent, but also freed me from distractions and the curiosity of others. I have been able to work at any time of the night and day and move around in a way that would have been quite impossible on dry land.

== Wireless experiments from the vessel ==
Of particular importance were the experiments conducted from Elettra in the Gulf of Tigullio – communication being established with a coast station in one of the Gualine towers on the Sestri Levante peninsula. In honour of this, the Gulf of Tigullio was renamed the Gulf of Marconi on the official Italian navy chart.

Marconi continued to experiment, concentrating his efforts on the short wave spectrum. In April 1923, he sailed from Falmouth to the Cape Verde Islands and monitored signals from the station at Poldhu in England, which was operating on a wavelength of 97 metres with a power of 1 Kw. It was noted that the signals disappeared at a distance of 2594 km (1400 nmi.) but at night-time they could be heard at 4632 km (2500 nmi.).

In 1924 thanks to an improved aerial at Poldhu, two-way communication from the yacht was established from the Mediterranean and the Atlantic on a wavelength of 32 metres. The same experiment also proved successful, with solid signals throughout the day, when Elettra was in port at Beirut. Another successful contact was made from the yacht (in the Mediterranean) to Sydney enabling Marconi to speak to the managing director of the Amalgamated Wireless Company. These experiments using beamed transmissions convinced the British government of the viability of shortwave (as opposed to the current use of longwave) and resulted in a contract with Marconi's company for a communications network, the Imperial Wireless Chain, linking stations in the British Empire with London. In 1926 a two-way communications link was officially inaugurated between Britain and Canada.

Elettra was in British waters in September 1925 when, during a run from Dover to Southampton, Marconi demonstrated the use of wireless for direction finding. On a wavelength of 6.09 metres, bearings were taken on a transmitter on the lighthouse at South Foreland. The receiving aerial on the yacht was a 2-foot length of wire suspended at one end of the bridge and reception was possible at a distance of up to 100 miles.

In 1929 the wireless equipment aboard Elettra, which had been fitted in 1923, was replaced by technicians from Marconi's company with an updated and improved installation.

Early in 1930 wireless telephony contact was made with AWA in Sydney and on 26 March of that year, Marconi achieved publicity worldwide when, by pressing a Morse key on his yacht in Genoa harbour, he remotely switched on the lights in Sydney for the opening of the World Exhibition.

Further experiments were conducted off the Italian coast in the 1930s on a wavelength of 57 cm using wireless telephony. In 1931 Elettra completed a round-the-world voyage. On 30 July 1934, with a 60 cm transmitting beacon on shore and a receiver in the chartroom, the windows of which had been covered, he successfully navigated the yacht between two buoys off Santa Margherita Ligure.

A four-way contact was established in November 1936 – the stations concerned being Elettra (at Santa Margherita Ligure), New York and two aircraft flying over that city.

Elettra sailed the seas of the world until, with the death of Marconi on 27 July 1937, she was acquired by the Italian Ministry of Communications for the sum of 820,000 lire.

== Fire on board Elettra ==
On 25 November 1936, there was a fire on the yacht while she was lying in the harbour at Civitavecchia near Rome. It was fortunate that Elettra was not at sea at the time. Firemen were soon on the spot and after several hours were able to extinguish the flames. Damage to the yacht was slight.

== Destruction during service with the Kriegsmarine (German Navy) during World War Two ==
At the outbreak of the Second World War the ship was moved to Trieste and in September 1943, following the Armistice of Cassibile, was requisitioned by the Germans and armed with five machine guns, one of 15mm and four of 20mm, mounted in twin turrets. Now part of the Kriegsmarine, she was brought into service first with the designation G-107 and then as NA-6. However, between September 1943 and the end of November of the same year, Professor Mario Picotti obtained permission from the Germans to dismantle and remove all of Marconi's wireless equipment. This was carried away in 19 large packing cases and deposited safely in the vaults of the Castello di san Giusto in Trieste. The equipment remained there until the end of 1947 before coming into the hands of the Milan Museum of Science and Technology where it was reassembled by the Ministry of Posts and Telecommunications.

The vessel sailed from Trieste on 28 December 1943 for a patrol along the Dalmatian coast. On 21 January 1944 she arrived off Diklo, near Zadar. The following morning she was spotted and attacked by allied fighter-bombers. The captain decided to run her aground before she sank.

== Fate of Elettra after World War Two ==
With the signing of the peace treaty, the wreck became the property of Yugoslavia and it was not until 1959 that authorisation was given for a survey to examine the possibility of recovery and return. The necessary permission was granted thanks to intervention by Josip Broz Tito following efforts by the then Foreign Minister, Antonio Segni, who would later become President of Italy. The ship was returned to Italy in 1962 having been re-floated and towed to the shipyard at San Rocco di Muggia near Trieste. However, the planned restoration stalled and the hulk was still languishing in the bay five years later.

The Ministry of Posts and Telecommunications prepared a study for a reconstruction but the high cost resulted in a postponement and eventual cancellation of the project.

== Locations of salvaged sections of the dismembered yacht ==
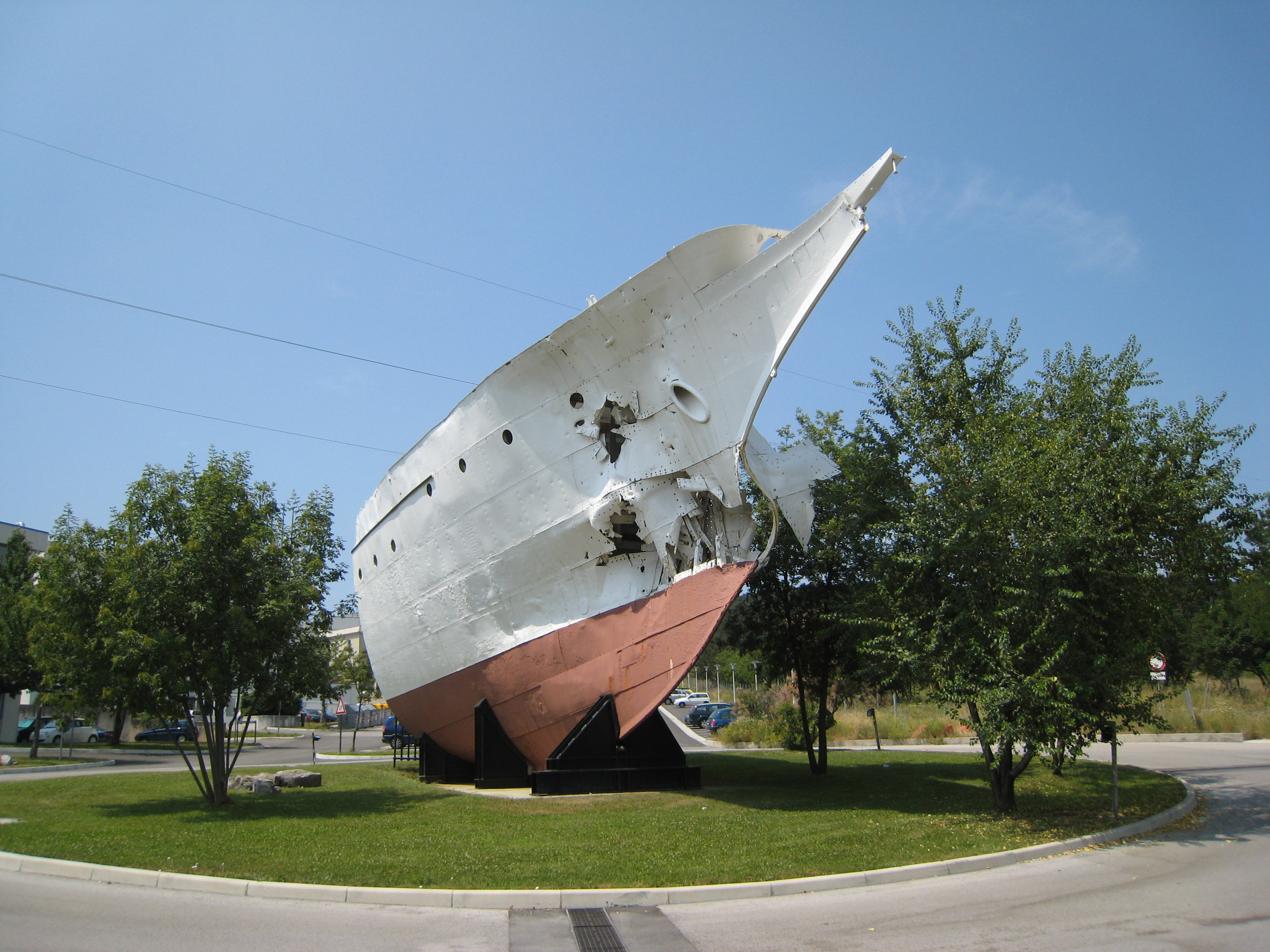
Prua Elettra

With all hope of a restoration lost it was decided that the remains of Elettra would be cut up and parts distributed around Italy to places that had been associated with Marconi and his work. The breaking up of the yacht started in April 1977, the largest section recovered being the bow ('la prua'), which now sits in the middle of a roundabout in the AREA Science Park at Trieste. The locations of this and of other sections, including the whereabouts of Marconi's wireless equipment, are detailed on pages 33–43 of the publication Marconi e lo yacht Elettra.

== Sources ==
- Berryman, Ron (May 2012). "Sir Max Waechter's European Unity League". Richmond History: Journal of the Richmond Local History Society. 33: 26–36.
- Migliorini, Nanni, Iacomino. Sasso e Dintorni, Anno VIII, No 24, Città de Sasso.Sasso & Dintorni. ""Marconi e lo yacht Elettra" (PDF)" (PDF) (in Italian).
- Goodwin, WD (1995) "One Hundred Years of Maritime Radio", Brown, Son & Ferguson, Glasgow
- Castelli, Cherini, Gellner. "Elettra – La Nave de Gieulemo Marconi (PDF)" (PDF) (in Italian).
- Associazione Marinara 'Aldebaran' Trieste, 12 October 2000.
