= Crespino =

- Comune
- Comune di Crespino
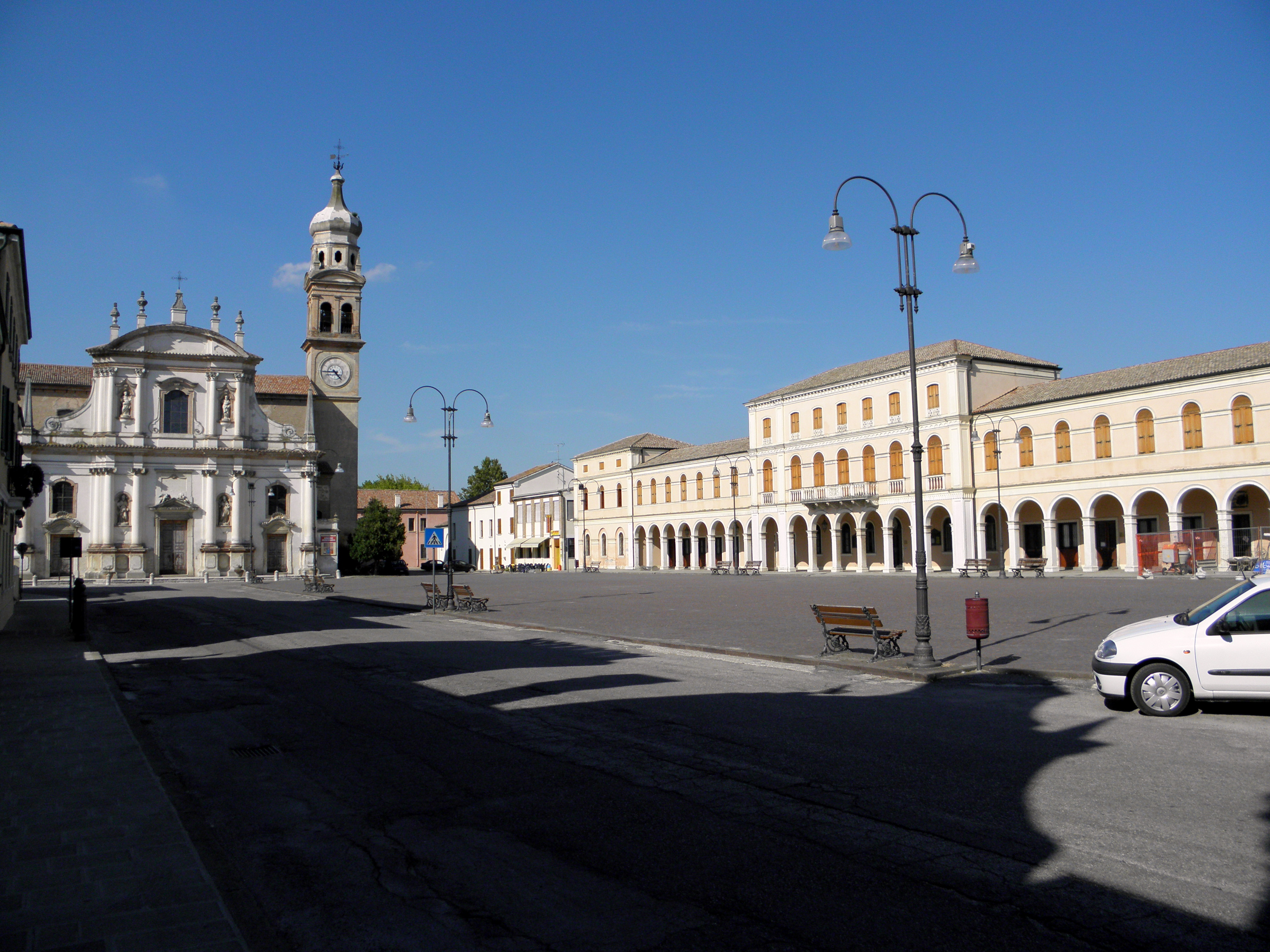
- Fetonte Square, at left the baroque facade of Santi Martino and Severo Church and at right the Town Hall

- Location within Italy Location within Veneto
- Coordinates: 44°59′N 11°53′E
- Country: Italy
- Region: Veneto
- Province: Province of Rovigo (RO)
- Frazioni: Arginello, Il Gorgo, La Banchina di Sopra, La Ruota, La Zagatta, Passodoppio, San Cassiano, Selva

Area
  - Total: 31.9 km^{2} (12.3 sq mi)

Population (Dec. 2004)
  - Total: 2,111
  - Density: 66.2/km^{2} (171/sq mi)
- Time zone: UTC+1 (CET)
  - Summer (DST): UTC+2 (CEST)
- Postal code: 45030
- Dialing code: 0425
- Website: Official website

Crespino is a comune (municipality) in the Province of Rovigo in the Italian region Veneto, located about 60 kilometres (37 mi) southwest of Venice and about 12 kilometres (7 mi) southeast of Rovigo. As of 31 December 2004, it had a population of 2,111 and an area of 31.9 square kilometres (12.3 mi^{2}).

The municipality of Crespino contains the frazioni (subdivisions, mainly villages and hamlets) Arginello, Il Gorgo, La Banchina di Sopra, La Ruota, La Zagatta, Passodoppio, San Cassiano, and Selva.

Crespino borders the following municipalities: Berra, Ceregnano, Gavello, Guarda Veneta, Pontecchio Polesine, Ro, Rovigo, Villanova Marchesana.

== Demographic evolution ==
Historical population

Year	Pop.	±%
1861	?	—
1871	4,275	—
1881	4,668	+9.2%
1901	4,571	−2.1%
1911	4,881	+6.8%

Year	Pop.	±%
1921	5,617	+15.1%
1931	5,901	+5.1%
1936	5,966	+1.1%
1951	6,080	+1.9%
1961	3,826	−37.1%

Year	Pop.	±%
1971	3,003	−21.5%
1981	2,623	−12.7%
1991	2,375	−9.5%
2001	2,097	−11.7%

Source: Data from ISTAT
