= Canaro, Rovigo =

Canaro
- Comune
- Comune di Canaro
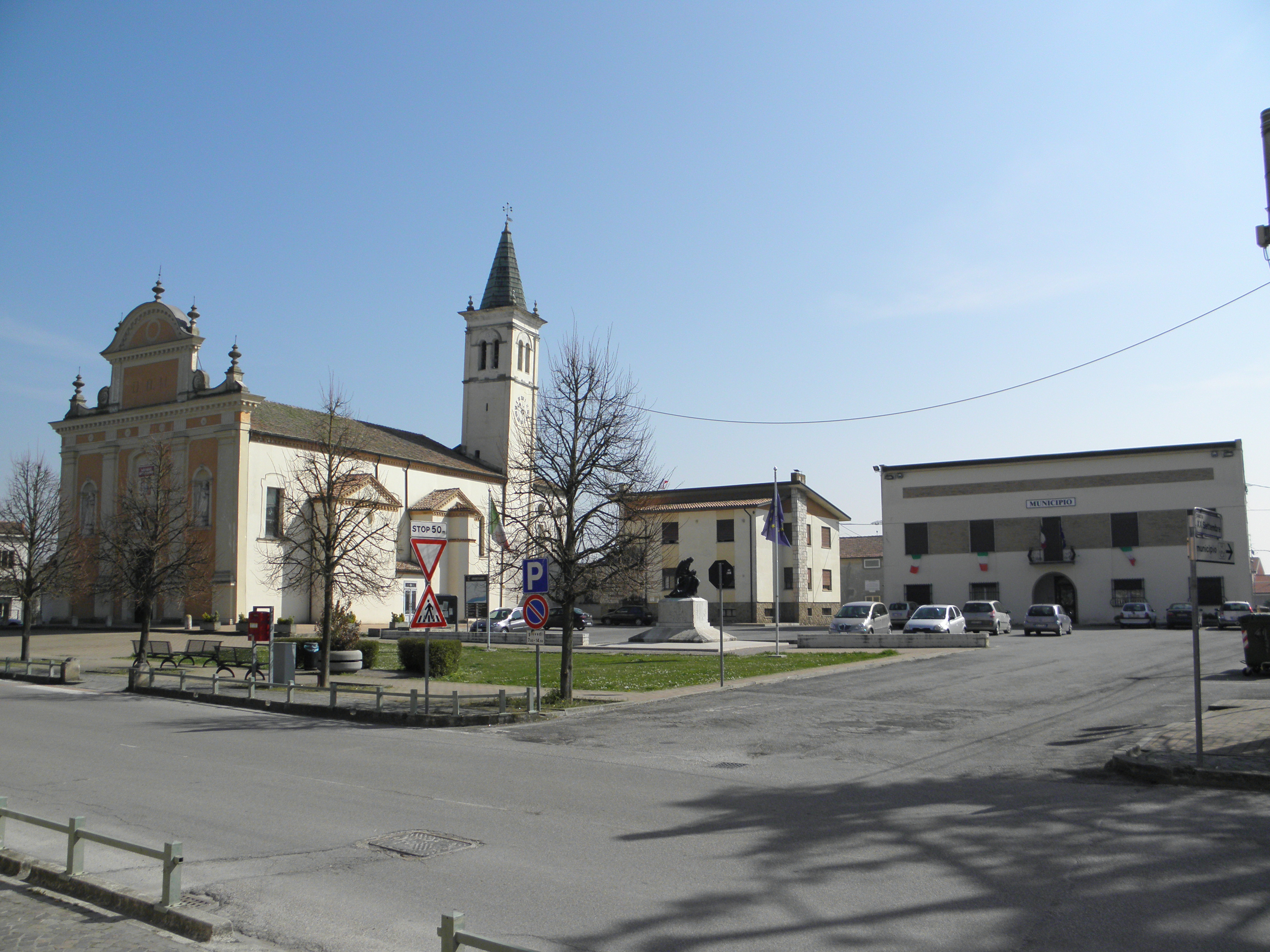
- Santa Sofia, the Parish church, and the Town Hall

- Location within Italy Location within Veneto
- Coordinates: 44°56′N 11°40′E
- Country: Italy
- Region: Veneto
- Province: Rovigo (RO)
- Frazioni: Baruchella, Boccalara, C. Benvenuto Tisi, C. Mella, C. Ruggieri, Ca' Matta, Croce del Sud, Crociara, Garofolo, Giaretta, La Frattina, Mezzavia, Paviole, Tenasi, Valiera, Vallone, Viezze

Area
  - Total: 32.7 km^{2} (12.6 sq mi)

Population (Dec. 2004)
  - Total: 2,885
  - Density: 88.2/km^{2} (229/sq mi)
- Demonym: Canaresi
- Time zone: UTC+1 (CET)
  - Summer (DST): UTC+2 (CEST)
- Postal code: 45034
- Dialing code: 0425
- Website: Official website

Canaro is a comune (municipality) in the Province of Rovigo in the Italian region Veneto, located about 80 kilometres (50 mi) southwest of Venice and about 15 kilometres (9 mi) southwest of Rovigo. As of 31 December 2004, it had a population of 2,885 and an area of 32.7 square kilometres (12.6 mi^{2}).

== Geography ==
The municipality of Canaro contains the frazioni (subdivisions, mainly villages and hamlets) Baruchella, Boccalara, C. Benvenuto Tisi, C.Mella, C.Ruggieri, Ca' Matta, Croce del Sud, Crociara, Garofolo, Giaretta, La Frattina, Mezzavia, Paviole, Tenasi, Valiera, Vallone, and Viezze.

Canaro borders the following municipalities: Ferrara, Fiesso Umbertiano, Frassinelle Polesine, Occhiobello, Polesella and Ro.

== Demographic evolution ==
Historical population

Year	Pop.	±%
1861	?	—
1871	3,263	—
1881	3,403	+4.3%
1901	3,177	−6.6%
1911	3,750	+18.0%

Year	Pop.	±%
1921	4,385	+16.9%
1931	5,023	+14.5%
1936	4,988	−0.7%
1951	5,173	+3.7%
1961	3,785	−26.8%

Year	Pop.	±%
1971	3,131	−17.3%
1981	2,908	−7.1%
1991	2,782	−4.3%
2001	2,838	+2.0%

Source: Data from ISTAT

== Twin towns ==
Canaro is twinned with:

- Gmina Pszczew, Poland
