= Arquà Polesine =

Arquà Polesine Arquà Połesine (Venetian)
- Comune
- Comune di Arquà Polesine
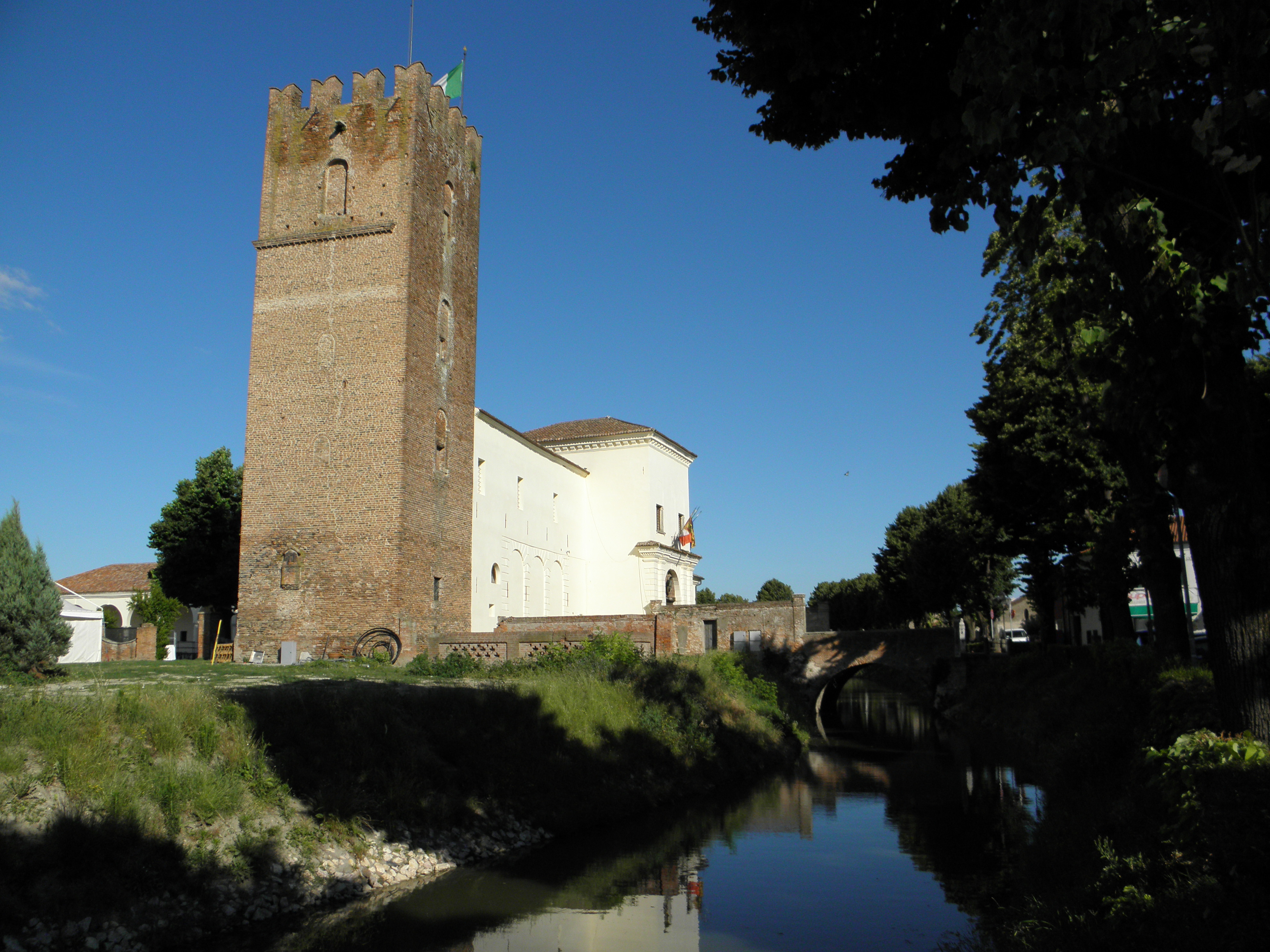
- The castle

- Coat of arms

- Location of Arquà Polesine in Italy Arquà Polesine (Veneto)
- Coordinates: 45°01′N 11°44′E
- Country: Italy
- Region: Veneto
- Province: Rovigo (RO)
- Frazioni: Ca'Brancalion, Ca'Torelli, Cornè, Granze, La Berlina, Valmolin di Mezzo, Valmolin Inferiore

Government
  - Mayor: Chiara Turolla

Area
  - Total: 19.93 km^{2} (7.70 sq mi)
- Elevation: 8 m (26 ft)

Population (30 April 2017)
  - Total: 2,682
  - Density: 134.6/km^{2} (348.5/sq mi)
- Demonym: Arquatesi
- Time zone: UTC+1 (CET)
  - Summer (DST): UTC+2 (CEST)
- Postal code: 45031
- Dialing code: 0425
- Website: Official website

Arquà Polesine (Italian pronunciation: [arˈkwa ppoˈleːzine]; Venetian: Arquà Połesine) is a comune (municipality) in the Province of Rovigo in the Italian region Veneto, located about 70 kilometres (43 mi) southwest of Venice and about 7 kilometres (4 mi) southwest of Rovigo.

Arquà Polesine borders the following municipalities: Bosaro, Costa di Rovigo, Frassinelle Polesine, Polesella, Rovigo, Villamarzana.

Sights include the castle, built in 1146 by Guglielmo III degli Adelardi Marcheselli, lord of Ferrara, and the parish church (rebuilt around 1516).

== Twin towns ==
Arquà Polesine is twinned with:

- Vourles, France.
