= Pontecchio Polesine =

- Comune
- Comune di Pontecchio Polesine
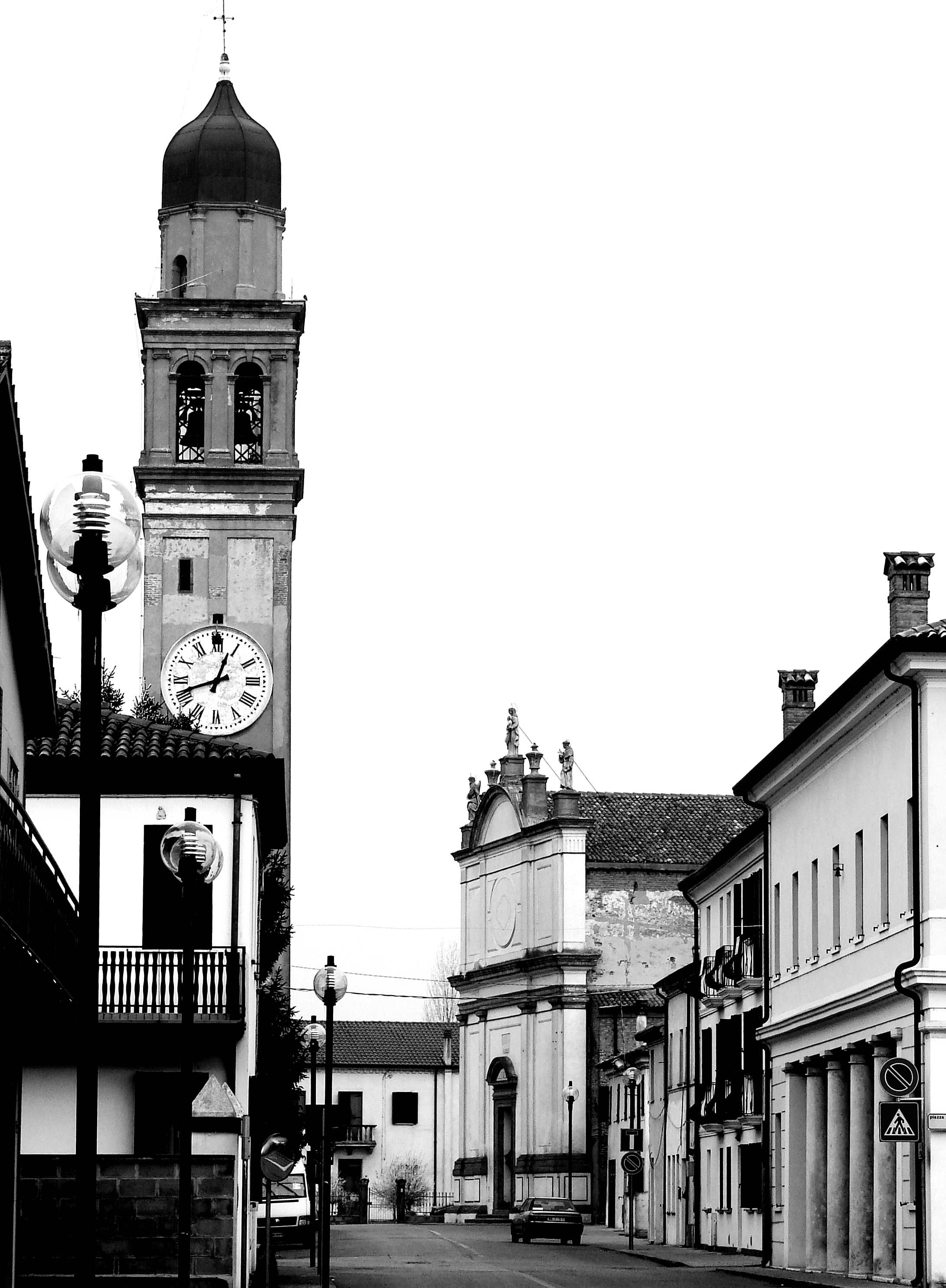

- Location within Italy Location within Veneto
- Coordinates: 45°1′N 11°49′E
- Country: Italy
- Region: Veneto
- Province: Province of Rovigo (RO)
- Frazioni: Borgo, Busi, Ca'Zanforlin, Chiaviche Roncagalle, L'Olmo, Selva

Area
  - Total: 11.5 km^{2} (4.4 sq mi)
- Elevation: 5 m (16 ft)

Population (Jan. 2019)
  - Total: 2,191
  - Density: 191/km^{2} (493/sq mi)
- Demonym: Pontecchiani
- Time zone: UTC+1 (CET)
  - Summer (DST): UTC+2 (CEST)
- Postal code: 45030
- Dialing code: 0425

Pontecchio Polesine is a comune (municipality) in the Province of Rovigo in the Italian region Veneto, located about 60 kilometres (37 mi) southwest of Venice and about 6 kilometres (4 mi) southeast of Rovigo. On 1 January 2019, it had a population of 2,191 and an area of 11.5 square kilometres (4.4 mi^{2}).

The municipality of Pontecchio Polesine contains the frazioni (subdivisions, mainly villages and hamlets) Borgo, Busi, Ca'Zanforlin, Chiaviche Roncagalle, L'Olmo, and Selva.

Pontecchio Polesine borders the following municipalities: Bosaro, Crespino, Guarda Veneta, Rovigo.

== Demographic evolution ==
Historical population

Year	Pop.	±%
1861	?	—
1871	1,546	—
1881	1,586	+2.6%
1901	1,750	+10.3%
1911	1,873	+7.0%

Year	Pop.	±%
1921	2,138	+14.1%
1931	2,199	+2.9%
1936	2,385	+8.5%
1951	2,633	+10.4%
1961	1,811	−31.2%

Year	Pop.	±%
1971	1,684	−7.0%
1981	1,518	−9.9%
1991	1,372	−9.6%
2001	1,516	+10.5%

Source: Data from ISTAT

== Notable persons ==
Adelmo Landini was born in Pontecchio Polesine in 1896. He moved to Bologna to obtain a technical license, and later served in the Italian army during World War I. Landini died in August 1965, and the Municipality of Sasso named a street for him near the Marconi Museum and Mausoleum.
