= Villamarzana =

- Comune
- Comune di Villamarzana
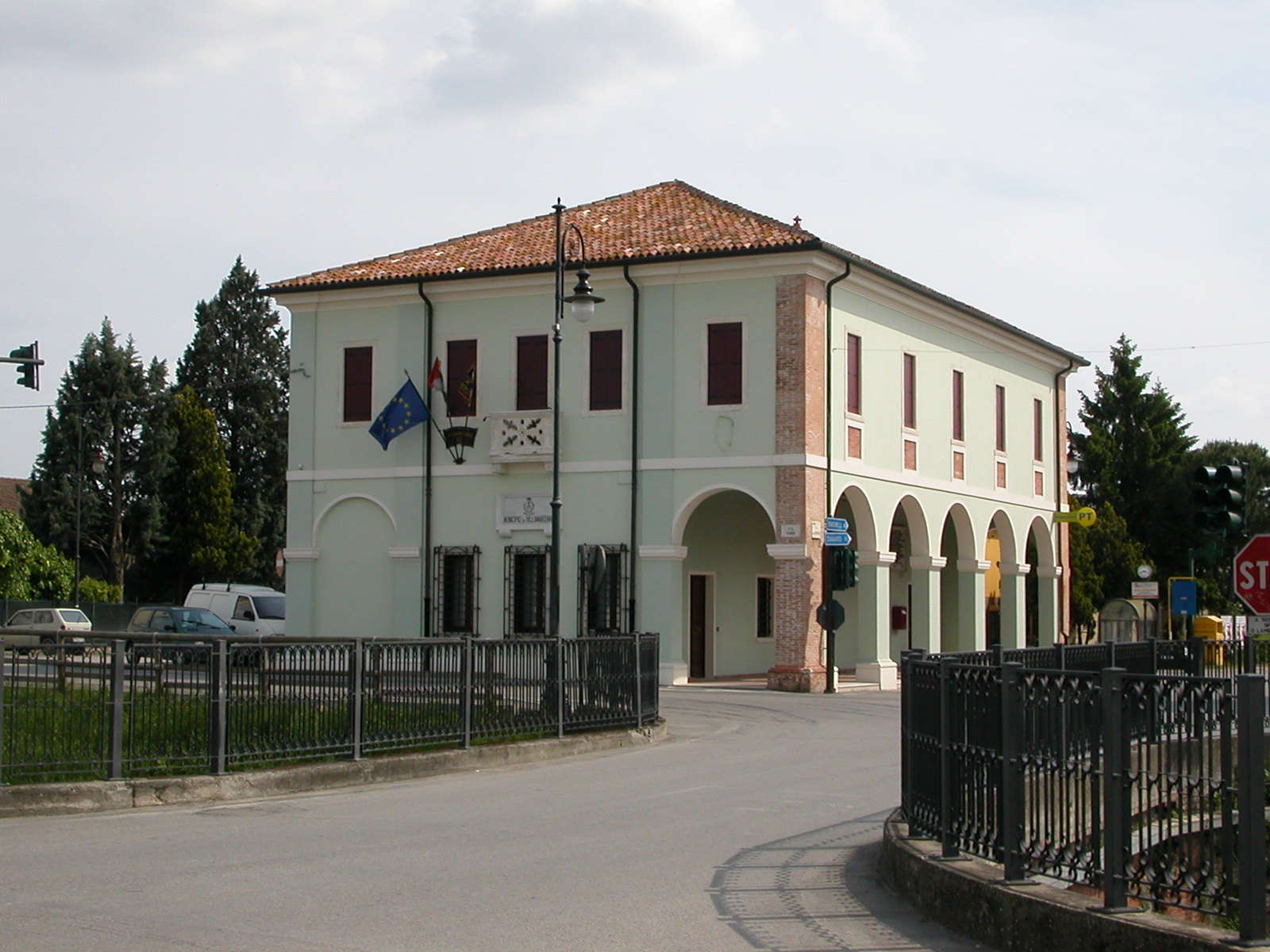
- The Town Hall

- Location within Italy Location within Veneto
- Coordinates: 45°1′N 11°41′E
- Country: Italy
- Region: Veneto
- Province: Province of Rovigo (RO)
- Frazioni: Bastion, Boaria, Fondo Cuore, Gambero, Gognano, I Maggio, Preguerre, Stongarde

Area
  - Total: 14.1 km^{2} (5.4 sq mi)

Population (Dec. 2004)
  - Total: 1,176
  - Density: 83.4/km^{2} (216/sq mi)
- Time zone: UTC+1 (CET)
  - Summer (DST): UTC+2 (CEST)
- Postal code: 45030
- Dialing code: 0425

Villamarzana is a comune (municipality) in the Province of Rovigo in the Italian region Veneto, located about 70 kilometres (43 mi) southwest of Venice and about 10 kilometres (6 mi) southwest of Rovigo. As of 31 December 2004, it had a population of 1,176 and an area of 14.1 square kilometres (5.4 mi^{2}).

The municipality of Villamarzana contains the frazioni (subdivisions, mainly villages and hamlets) Bastion, Boaria, Fondo Cuore, Gambero, Gognano, I Maggio, Preguerre, and Stongarde.

Villamarzana borders the following municipalities: Arquà Polesine, Costa di Rovigo, Frassinelle Polesine, Fratta Polesine, Pincara.

== Demographic evolution ==
Historical population

Year	Pop.	±%
1861	?	—
1871	1,556	—
1881	1,717	+10.3%
1901	1,678	−2.3%
1911	1,905	+13.5%

Year	Pop.	±%
1921	2,054	+7.8%
1931	2,278	+10.9%
1936	2,430	+6.7%
1951	2,529	+4.1%
1961	1,733	−31.5%

Year	Pop.	±%
1971	1,436	−17.1%
1981	1,279	−10.9%
1991	1,197	−6.4%
2001	1,213	+1.3%

Source: Data from ISTAT
