= Piergiorgio Farina =

Italian jazz violinist, composer and singer

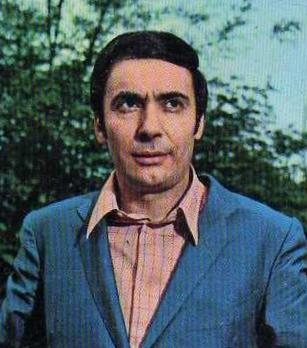
- Piergiorgio Farina in 1969

Background information
- Born: 25 April 1933; Goro, Emilia–Romagna, Kingdom of Italy
- Died: 28 July 2008 (aged 75) Bologna, Emilia–Romagna, Italy
- Occupations: Violinist; composer; singer

Piergiorgio Farina (25 April 1933 – 28 July 2008) was an Italian jazz violinist, composer and singer.

== Career ==
Born Piergiorgio Farinelli in Goro, Ferrara, Farina was the cousin of the singer Milva. He started his career performing in Emilia-Romagna's ballrooms, and had his breakout in the second half of the 1960s thanks to his participation to the RAI musical variety Settevoci.

In 1968, he entered the competition at the Sanremo Music Festival in a couple with Orietta Berti with the song ″Tu che non sorridi mai″, while in the 1975 edition of the Festival he was cast to perform on violin all the competing songs. He was also a sax, double bass and piano musician.

His son Bruno is also a musician.

== Discography ==
Albums

- 1971: Piergiorgio Farina – Piccolo Cabotaggio
- 1974: Il violino d'amore di Piergiorgio Farina
- 1975: Violino d'amore
- 1977: Tempo di rock
- 1977: Piergiorgio Farina
- 1978: ...a tutto rock!!!
- 1979: Trasloco
- 1981: Amore
- 1982: Musica
- 1983: Immagina che .....
- 1985: Uno Strumento In Primo Piano: Violino
- 1985: Diario
- 1986: Gran gala
- 1988: Dolci ricordi
- 1988: Un' Orchestra Per La Radio 2
- 1989: Napoli appassionata
- 1990: Tango
- 1991: Classic
- 1996: Balliamo Con Il Violino Di Piergiorgio Farina
- (Unknown): I Miei Successi
