= Mesola =

- Comune
- Comune di Mesola
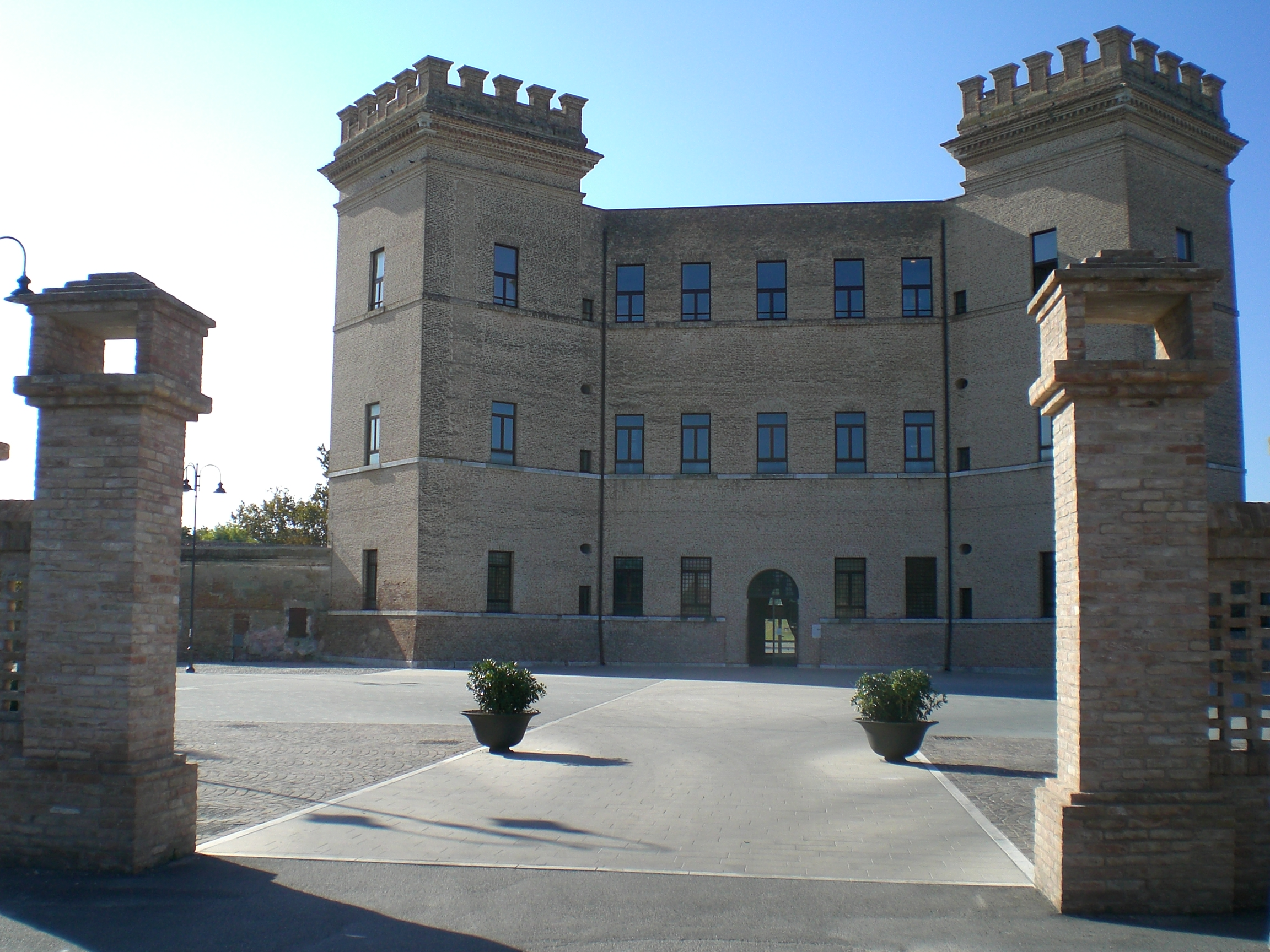
- Mesola Castle

- Flag Coat of arms

- Location within Italy Location within Emilia-Romagna
- Coordinates: 44°55′N 12°14′E
- Country: Italy
- Region: Emilia-Romagna
- Province: Province of Ferrara (FE)

Area
  - Total: 85 km^{2} (33 sq mi)
- Elevation: 1 m (3.3 ft)

Population (30 April 2009)
  - Total: 7,223
  - Density: 85/km^{2} (220/sq mi)
- Time zone: UTC+1 (CET)
  - Summer (DST): UTC+2 (CEST)
- Postal code: 44026
- Dialing code: 0533
- Website: Official website

Mesola (Ferrarese: La Mèsula) is a comune (municipality) in the Province of Ferrara in the Italian region Emilia-Romagna, located about 80 kilometres (50 mi) northeast of Bologna and about 50 kilometres (31 mi) east of Ferrara. As of 31 December 2004, it had a population of 7,331 and an area of 84.2 square kilometres (32.5 mi^{2}).

Mesola borders the following municipalities: Ariano nel Polesine, Berra, Codigoro, Goro.

One of the landmarks in the town is the Castle of Mesola, built between 1578 and 1583, mainly used as a hunting lodge by the Este dynasty. It now houses the civic library and the Museum of the Wood and Deer of Mesola.

== Demographic evolution ==
Historical population

Year	Pop.	±%
1861	4,835	—
1871	5,071	+4.9%
1881	5,612	+10.7%
1901	7,059	+25.8%
1911	7,805	+10.6%

Year	Pop.	±%
1921	9,076	+16.3%
1931	9,582	+5.6%
1936	10,284	+7.3%
1951	11,974	+16.4%
1961	9,500	−20.7%

Year	Pop.	±%
1971	8,066	−15.1%
1981	8,233	+2.1%
1991	7,963	−3.3%
2001	7,470	−6.2%

Source: Data from ISTAT
