= Villanova Marchesana =

- Comune
- Comune di Villanova Marchesana
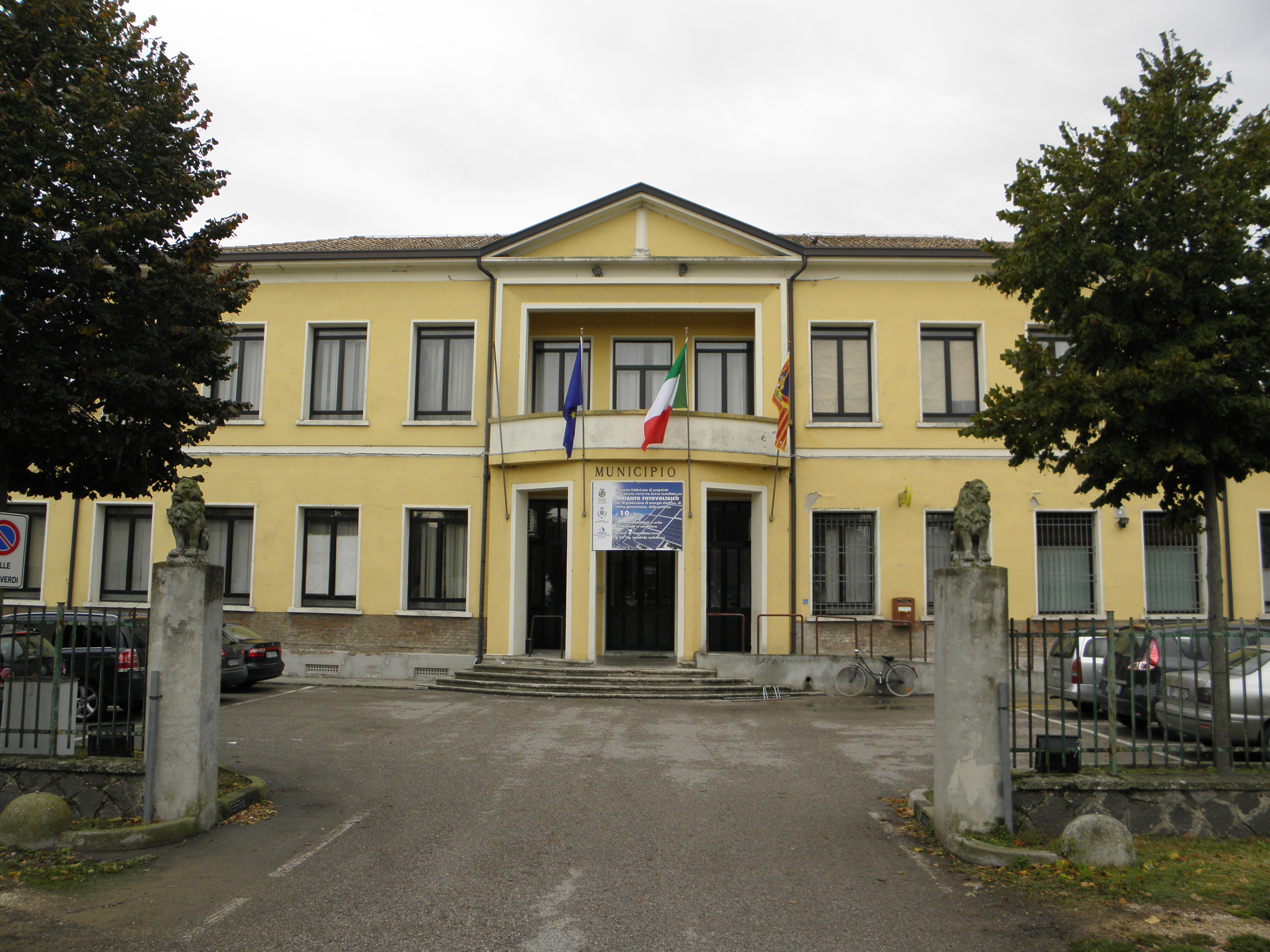
- Town hall

- Location within Italy Location within Veneto
- Coordinates: 45°0′N 11°58′E
- Country: Italy
- Region: Veneto
- Province: Province of Rovigo (RO)
- Frazioni: Ca' de Rusco, Canalazzo, Canalnuovo, Capo di Sopra, Casette, Cisimatti, Ponte

Area
  - Total: 18.2 km^{2} (7.0 sq mi)

Population (Dec. 2004)
  - Total: 1,109
  - Density: 60.9/km^{2} (158/sq mi)
- Time zone: UTC+1 (CET)
  - Summer (DST): UTC+2 (CEST)
- Postal code: 45030
- Dialing code: 0425

Villanova Marchesana is a comune (municipality) in the Province of Rovigo in the Italian region Veneto, located about 60 kilometres (37 mi) southwest of Venice and about 15 kilometres (9 mi) southeast of Rovigo. As of 31 December 2004, it had a population of 1,109 and an area of 18.2 square kilometres (7.0 mi^{2}).

The municipality of Villanova Marchesana contains the frazioni (subdivisions, mainly villages and hamlets) Ca' de Rusco, Canalazzo, Canalnuovo, Capo di Sopra, Casette, Cisimatti, and Ponte.

Villanova Marchesana borders the following municipalities: Adria, Berra, Crespino, Gavello, Papozze.

== Demographic evolution ==
Historical population

Year	Pop.	±%
1861	?	—
1871	1,805	—
1881	2,014	+11.6%
1901	2,082	+3.4%
1911	2,662	+27.9%

Year	Pop.	±%
1921	2,940	+10.4%
1931	3,221	+9.6%
1936	3,246	+0.8%
1951	3,573	+10.1%
1961	2,314	−35.2%

Year	Pop.	±%
1971	1,446	−37.5%
1981	1,255	−13.2%
1991	1,105	−12.0%
2001	1,038	−6.1%

Source: Data from ISTAT
