= Ariano nel Polesine =

- Comune
- Comune di Ariano nel Polesine
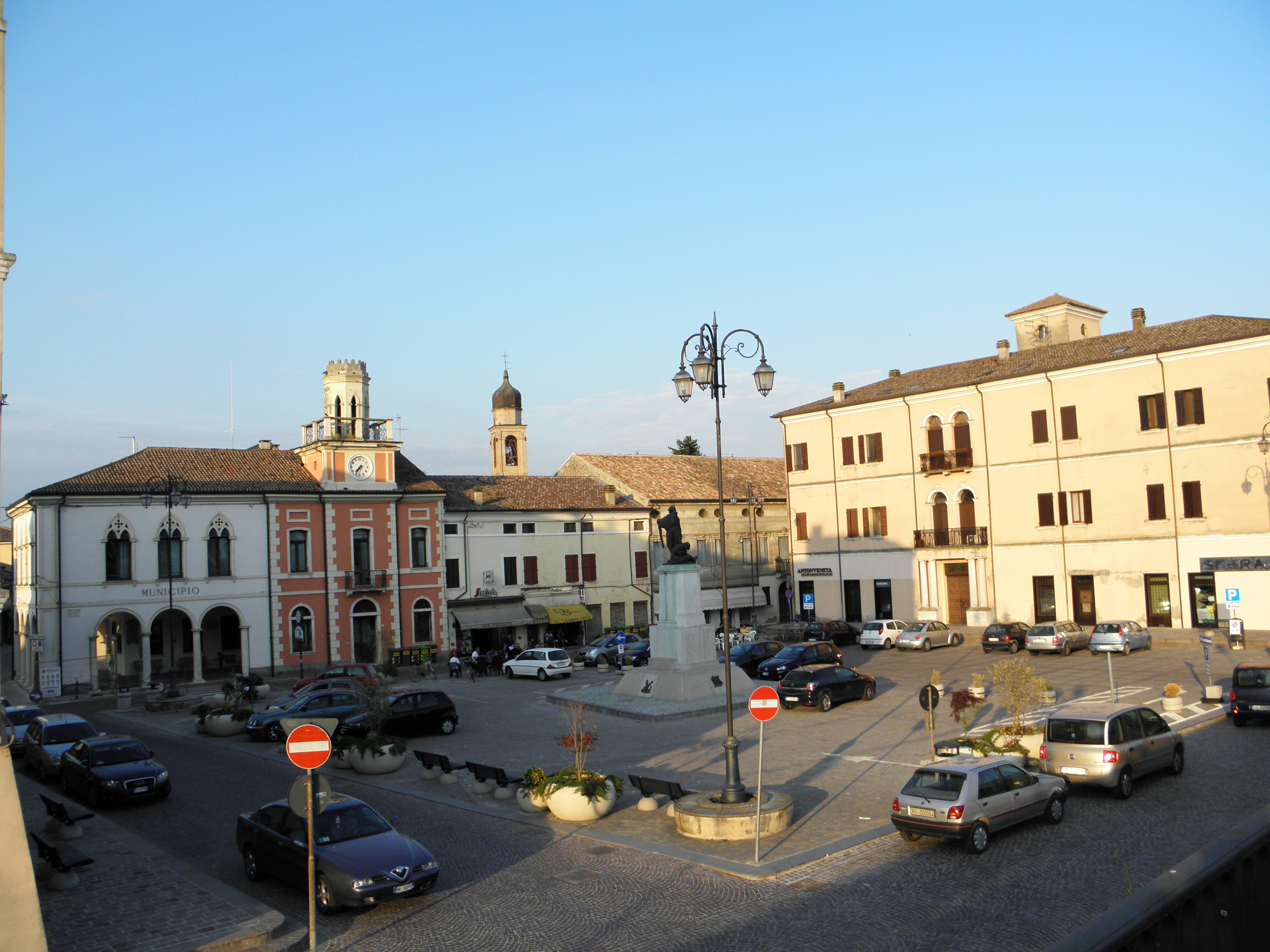
- Piazza Garibaldi with the Town Hall.

- Coat of arms

- Ariano nel Polesine within the Province of Rovigo

- Location of Ariano nel Polesine in Italy Ariano nel Polesine (Veneto)
- Coordinates: 44°57′N 12°7′E
- Country: Italy
- Region: Veneto
- Province: Rovigo (RO)
- Frazioni: Bacucco, Crociara, Crociarone, Gorino Veneto, Grillara, Piano, Rivà, San Basilio, Santamaria in Punta,

Government
  - Mayor: Luisa Beltrame

Area
  - Total: 80.63 km^{2} (31.13 sq mi)
- Elevation: 2 m (6.6 ft)

Population (30 April 2017)
  - Total: 4,267
  - Density: 52.92/km^{2} (137.1/sq mi)
- Demonym: Arianesi
- Time zone: UTC+1 (CET)
  - Summer (DST): UTC+2 (CEST)
- Postal code: 45012
- Dialing code: 0426
- Website: Official website

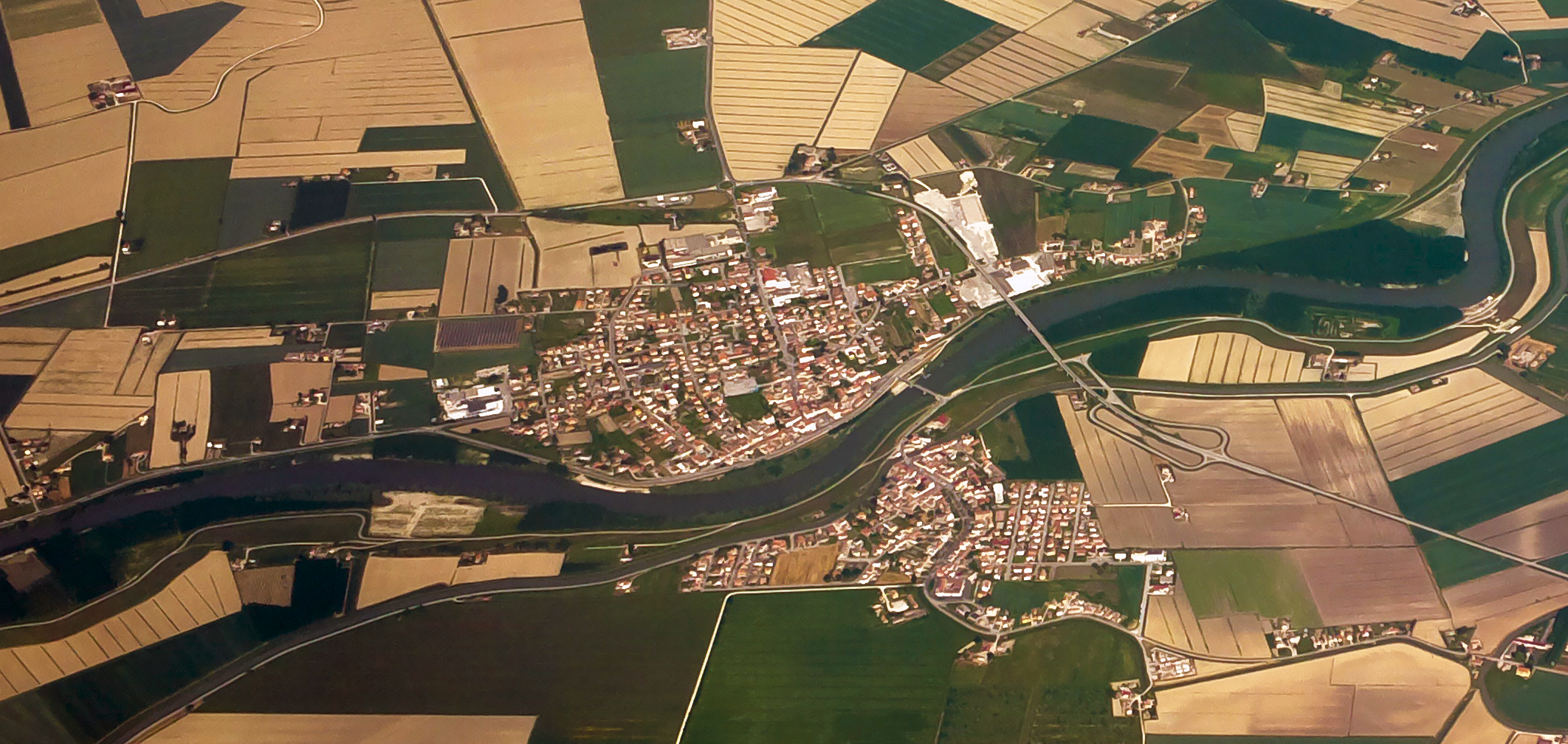
Ariano nel Polesine

Ariano nel Polesine is a comune (municipality) in the Province of Rovigo, in the Italian region Veneto. It is located about 60 kilometres (37 mi) southwest of Venice, and about 30 kilometres (19 mi) southeast of Rovigo.

== Geography ==
Ariano nel Polesine borders the following municipalities: Berra, Corbola, Goro, Mesola, Papozze, Taglio di Po.
