= Polesella =

- Comune
- Comune di Polesella
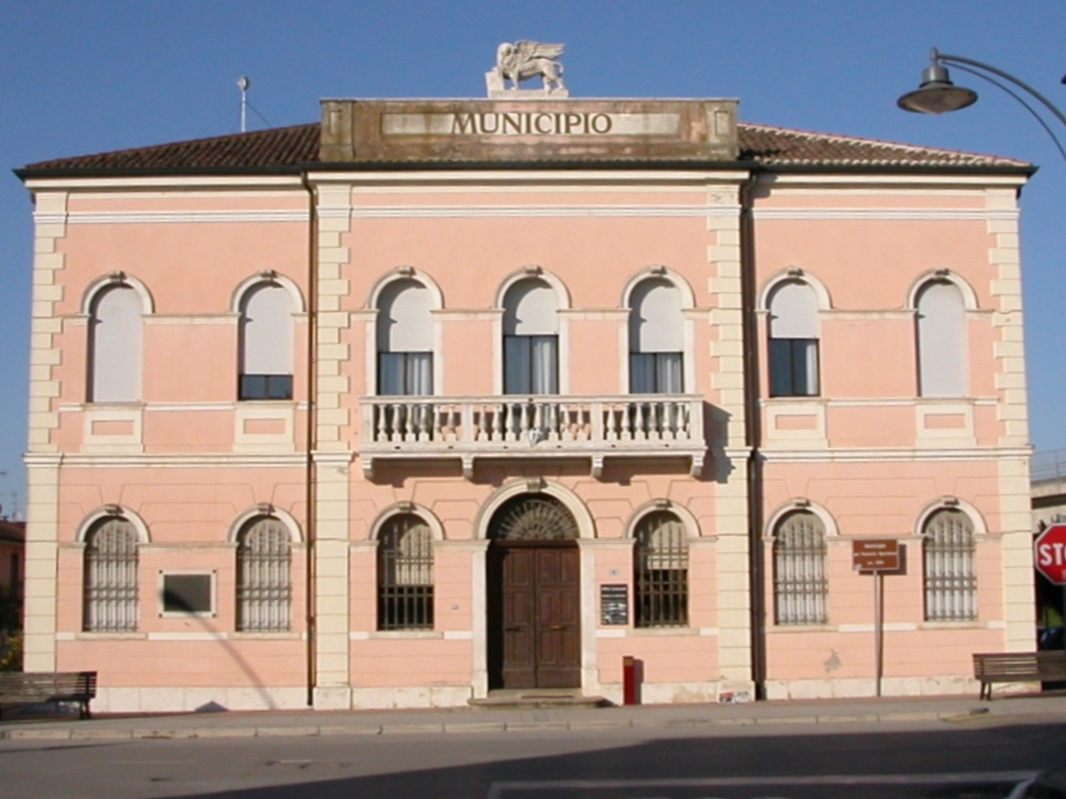
- Town hall.

- Coat of arms

- Location within Italy Location within Veneto
- Coordinates: 44°58′N 11°45′E
- Country: Italy
- Region: Veneto
- Province: Rovigo (RO)
- Frazioni: Raccano

Government
  - Mayor: Leonardo Raito

Area
  - Total: 16.6 km^{2} (6.4 sq mi)
- Elevation: 6 m (20 ft)

Population (1 December 2011)
  - Total: 4,192
  - Density: 253/km^{2} (654/sq mi)
- Time zone: UTC+1 (CET)
  - Summer (DST): UTC+2 (CEST)
- Postal code: 45038
- Dialing code: 0425

Polesella is a comune (municipality) in the Province of Rovigo in the Italian region Veneto, located about 70 kilometres (43 miles) southwest of Venice and about 11 km (7 mi) south of Rovigo.

Polesella borders the following municipalities: Arquà Polesine, Bosaro, Canaro, Frassinelle Polesine, Guarda Veneta, Ro.

In 1509 it was the location of the homonymous battle between the Venetian fleet and the troops of Ferrara. The town is home to the Palazzo Grimani, a 16th-century patrician residence attributed to Vincenzo Scamozzi and the Villa Morosini (16th–17th centuries).

== Twin towns ==
- Lučenec, Slovakia
- Svetvinčenat, Croatia
