= Corbola =

- Comune
- Comune di Corbola
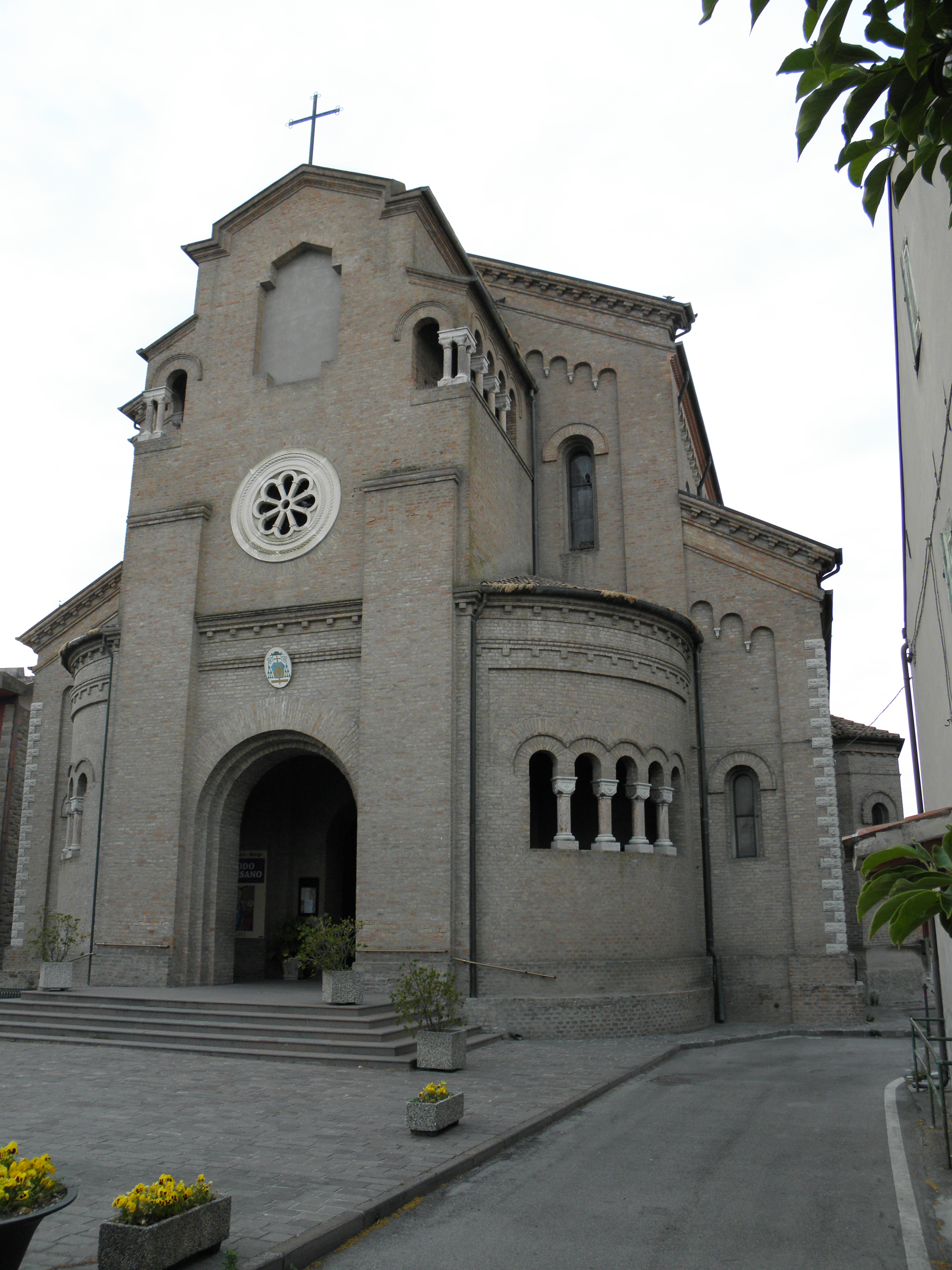
- Santa Maria Maria Maddalena (Saint Mary Magdalene), the Parish church in the centre of Corbola

- Location within Italy Location within Veneto
- Coordinates: 45°0′N 12°5′E
- Country: Italy
- Region: Veneto
- Province: Rovigo (RO)

Government
  - Mayor: Michele Domeneghetti

Area
  - Total: 18.4 km^{2} (7.1 sq mi)
- Elevation: 2 m (6.6 ft)

Population (28 February 2017)
  - Total: 2,407
  - Density: 131/km^{2} (339/sq mi)
- Demonym: Corbolesi
- Time zone: UTC+1 (CET)
  - Summer (DST): UTC+2 (CEST)
- Postal code: 45015
- Dialing code: 0426
- Website: Official website

Corbola is a comune (municipality) in the Province of Rovigo in the Italian region Veneto, located about 50 kilometres (31 mi) southwest of Venice and about 25 kilometres (16 mi) southeast of Rovigo.

Corbola borders the following municipalities: Adria, Ariano nel Polesine, Papozze, Taglio di Po.
