= Loreo, Veneto =

Loreo
- Comune
- Comune di Loreo
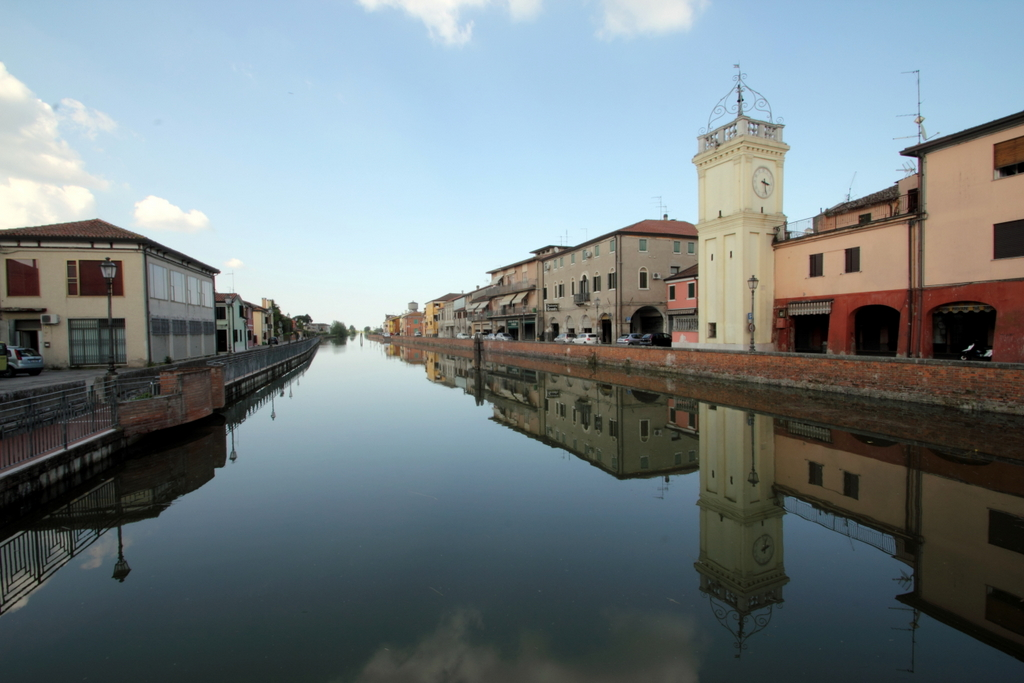
- Loreo: the channel of Loreo (Canale di Loreo) and, on the right, the civic bell tower

- Location within Italy Location within Veneto
- Coordinates: 45°4′N 12°12′E
- Country: Italy
- Region: Veneto
- Province: Province of Rovigo (RO)
- Frazioni: Ca'Negra, Canalvecchio, Cavanella Po, Pilastro, Retinella, Sostegno, Tornova

Area
  - Total: 39.6 km^{2} (15.3 sq mi)

Population (Dec. 2004)
  - Total: 3,873
  - Density: 97.8/km^{2} (253/sq mi)
- Demonym: Loredani
- Time zone: UTC+1 (CET)
  - Summer (DST): UTC+2 (CEST)
- Postal code: 45017
- Dialing code: 0426

Loreo is a comune (municipality) in the Province of Rovigo in the Italian region Veneto, located about 40 kilometres (25 mi) south of Venice and about 35 kilometres (22 mi) east of Rovigo. As of 31 December 2004, it had a population of 3,873 and an area of 39.6 square kilometres (15.3 mi^{2}).

The municipality of Loreo contains the frazioni (subdivisions, mainly villages and hamlets) Ca'Negra, Canalvecchio, Cavanella Po, Pilastro, Retinella, Sostegno, and Tornova.

Loreo borders the following municipalities: Adria, Cavarzere, Chioggia, Porto Viro, Rosolina, Taglio di Po.

== Demographic evolution ==
Historical population

Year	Pop.	±%
1861	?	—
1871	3,603	—
1881	4,020	+11.6%
1901	4,602	+14.5%
1911	5,480	+19.1%

Year	Pop.	±%
1921	6,176	+12.7%
1931	6,070	−1.7%
1936	6,333	+4.3%
1951	6,714	+6.0%
1961	4,604	−31.4%

Year	Pop.	±%
1971	3,729	−19.0%
1981	3,626	−2.8%
1991	3,785	+4.4%
2001	3,718	−1.8%

Source: Data from ISTAT
