= Ro, Emilia-Romagna =

Ro
- Comune
- Comune di Ro
- Location within Italy Location within Emilia-Romagna
- Coordinates: 44°56′N 11°45′E
- Country: Italy
- Region: Emilia-Romagna
- Province: Province of Ferrara (FE)
- Frazioni: Alberone, Guarda, Ruina, Zocca

Area
  - Total: 43.0 km^{2} (16.6 sq mi)
- Elevation: 5 m (16 ft)

Population (Dec. 2004)
  - Total: 3,663
  - Density: 85.2/km^{2} (221/sq mi)
- Time zone: UTC+1 (CET)
  - Summer (DST): UTC+2 (CEST)
- Postal code: 44030
- Dialing code: 0532
- Website: Official website

Ro (Ferrarese: Rò) is a comune (municipality) in the Province of Ferrara in the Italian region Emilia-Romagna, located about 60 kilometres (37 mi) northeast of Bologna and about 15 kilometres (9 mi) northeast of Ferrara. As of 31 December 2004, it had a population of 3,663 and an area of 43.0 square kilometres (16.6 mi^{2}).

The municipality of Ro contains the frazioni (subdivisions, mainly villages and hamlets) Alberone, Guarda, Ruina, and Zocca.

Ro borders the following municipalities: Berra, Canaro, Copparo, Crespino, Ferrara, Guarda Veneta, Polesella.

== Demographic evolution ==
Historical population

| Year | Pop. | ±% |
|---|---|---|
| 1861 | 4,001 | — |
| 1871 | 4,353 | +8.8% |
| 1881 | 4,956 | +13.9% |
| 1901 | 5,761 | +16.2% |
| 1911 | 5,682 | −1.4% |

| Year | Pop. | ±% |
|---|---|---|
| 1921 | 6,524 | +14.8% |
| 1931 | 6,709 | +2.8% |
| 1936 | 6,701 | −0.1% |
| 1951 | 7,265 | +8.4% |
| 1961 | 5,722 | −21.2% |

| Year | Pop. | ±% |
|---|---|---|
| 1971 | 4,671 | −18.4% |
| 1981 | 4,531 | −3.0% |
| 1991 | 4,164 | −8.1% |
| 2001 | 3,811 | −8.5% |

Source: Data from ISTAT
