= Frassinelle Polesine =

- Comune
- Comune di Frassinelle Polesine
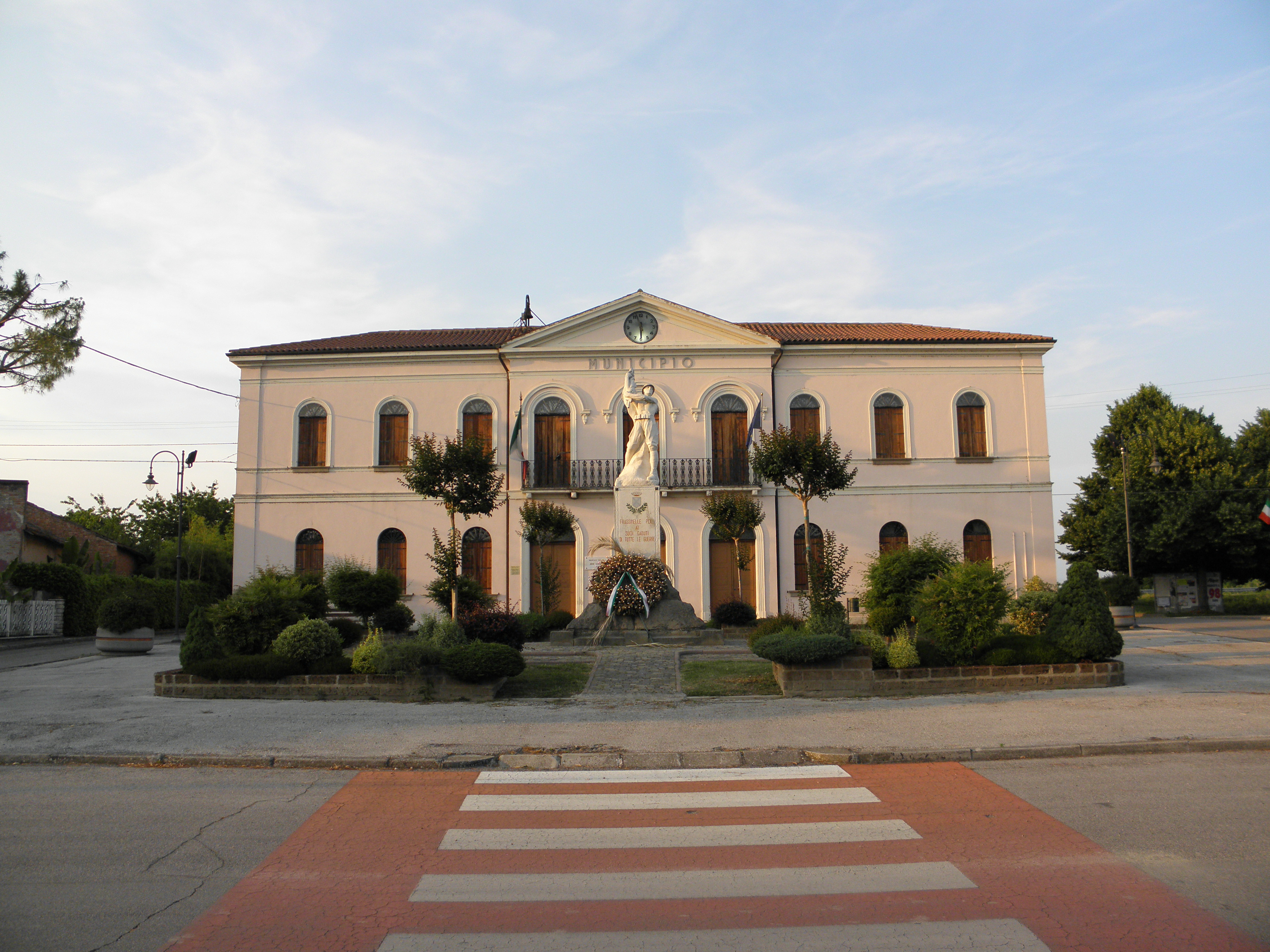
- The Town Hall

- Location within Italy Location within Veneto
- Coordinates: 45°0′N 11°42′E
- Country: Italy
- Region: Veneto
- Province: Province of Rovigo (RO)
- Frazioni: Caporumiatti, Casotti, Chiesa, Crociara, Le Cornere, Passo di Villamarzana, Viezze

Government
  - Mayor: Ennio Pasqualin (since June 14, 2004)

Area
  - Total: 21.9 km^{2} (8.5 sq mi)

Population (31 December 2004)
  - Total: 1,559
  - Density: 71.2/km^{2} (184/sq mi)
- Time zone: UTC+1 (CET)
  - Summer (DST): UTC+2 (CEST)
- Postal code: 45030
- Dialing code: 0425

Frassinelle Polesine is a comune (municipality) in the Province of Rovigo in the Italian region Veneto, located about 70 kilometres (43 mi) southwest of Venice and about 10 kilometres (6 mi) southwest of Rovigo. As of 31 December 2004, it had a population of 1,559 and an area of 21.9 square kilometres (8.5 mi^{2}).

The municipality of Frassinelle Polesine contains the frazioni (subdivisions, mainly villages and hamlets) Caporumiatti, Casotti, Chiesa, Crociara, Le Cornere, Passo di Villamarzana, and Viezze.

Frassinelle Polesine borders the following municipalities: Arquà Polesine, Canaro, Fiesso Umbertiano, Pincara, Polesella, Villamarzana.

== Demographic evolution ==
Historical population

Year	Pop.	±%
1861	?	—
1871	1,523	—
1881	1,587	+4.2%
1901	1,593	+0.4%
1911	2,148	+34.8%

Year	Pop.	±%
1921	2,341	+9.0%
1931	2,725	+16.4%
1936	3,146	+15.4%
1951	3,183	+1.2%
1961	2,298	−27.8%

Year	Pop.	±%
1971	1,960	−14.7%
1981	1,844	−5.9%
1991	1,751	−5.0%
2001	1,626	−7.1%

Source: Data from ISTAT
