= Taglio di Po =

- Comune
- Comune di Taglio di Po
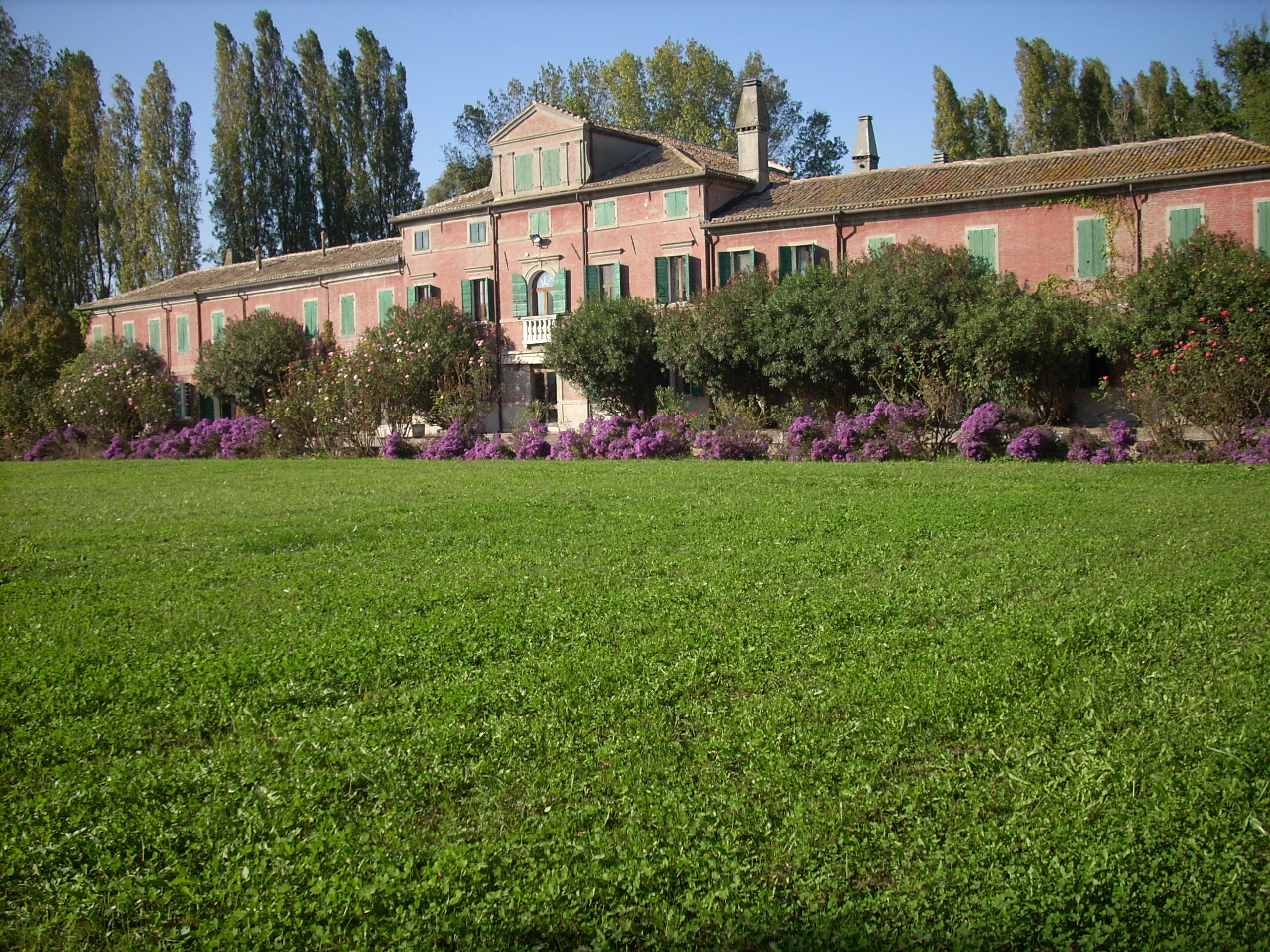
- Ca' Zen.

- Coat of arms

- Location within Italy Location within Veneto
- Coordinates: 45°0′N 12°13′E
- Country: Italy
- Region: Veneto
- Province: Rovigo (RO)
- Frazioni: Mazzorno Destro, Zona Marina

Government
  - Mayor: Francesco Siviero

Area
  - Total: 79.0 km^{2} (30.5 sq mi)
- Elevation: −2 m (−6.6 ft)

Population (31 December 2015)
  - Total: 8,356
  - Density: 106/km^{2} (274/sq mi)
- Demonym: Tagliolesi
- Time zone: UTC+1 (CET)
  - Summer (DST): UTC+2 (CEST)
- Postal code: 45019
- Dialing code: 0426
- Website: Official website

Taglio di Po is a comune (municipality) in the Province of Rovigo in the Italian region Veneto, located about 50 kilometres (31 mi) south of Venice and about 35 kilometres (22 mi) east of Rovigo, in the lower Polesine.

Taglio di Po borders the municipalities of Adria, Ariano nel Polesine, Corbola, Loreo, Porto Tolle, and Porto Viro.

== Twin towns ==
Taglio di Po is twinned with:

- Omišalj, Croatia
