= Berra =

- Comune
- Comune di Berra
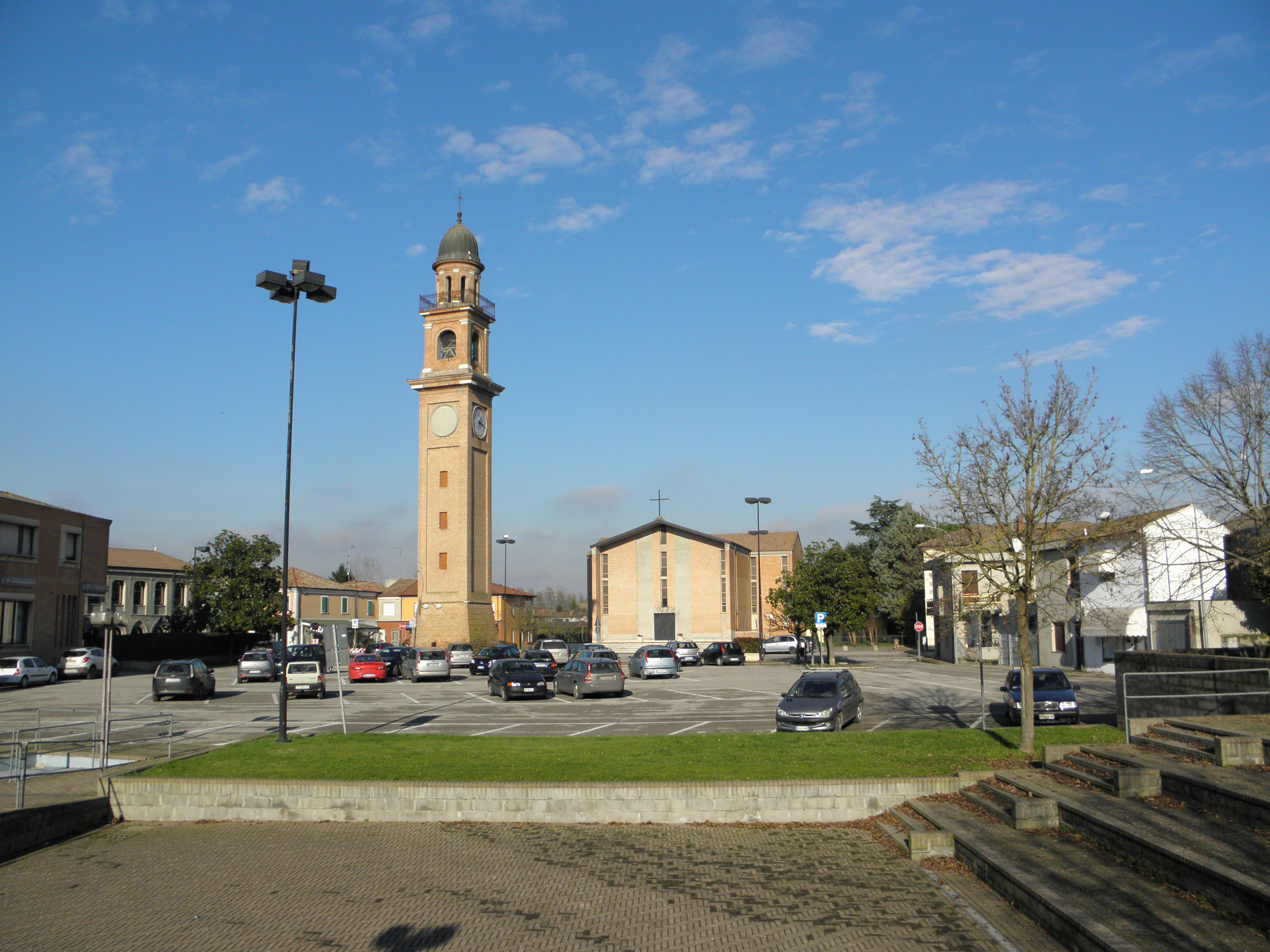
- View of Berra

- Location within Italy Location within Emilia-Romagna
- Coordinates: 44°59′N 11°58′E
- Country: Italy
- Region: Emilia-Romagna
- Province: Ferrara (FE)
- Frazioni: Cologna, Serravalle

Government
  - Mayor: Eric Zaghini

Area
  - Total: 68.64 km^{2} (26.50 sq mi)
- Elevation: 2 m (6.6 ft)

Population (30 April 2017)
  - Total: 4,743
  - Density: 69.10/km^{2} (179.0/sq mi)
- Demonym: Berresi
- Time zone: UTC+1 (CET)
  - Summer (DST): UTC+2 (CEST)
- Postal code: 44033
- Dialing code: 0532
- Website: Official website

Berra (Ferrarese: La Bèra) is a comune (municipality) in the Province of Ferrara in the Italian region Emilia-Romagna, located about 70 kilometres (43 mi) northeast of Bologna and about 30 kilometres (19 mi) northeast of Ferrara.

Berra borders the following municipalities: Ariano nel Polesine, Codigoro, Copparo, Crespino, Jolanda di Savoia, Mesola, Papozze, Ro, Villanova Marchesana.
