= Papozze =

- Comune
- Comune di Papozze
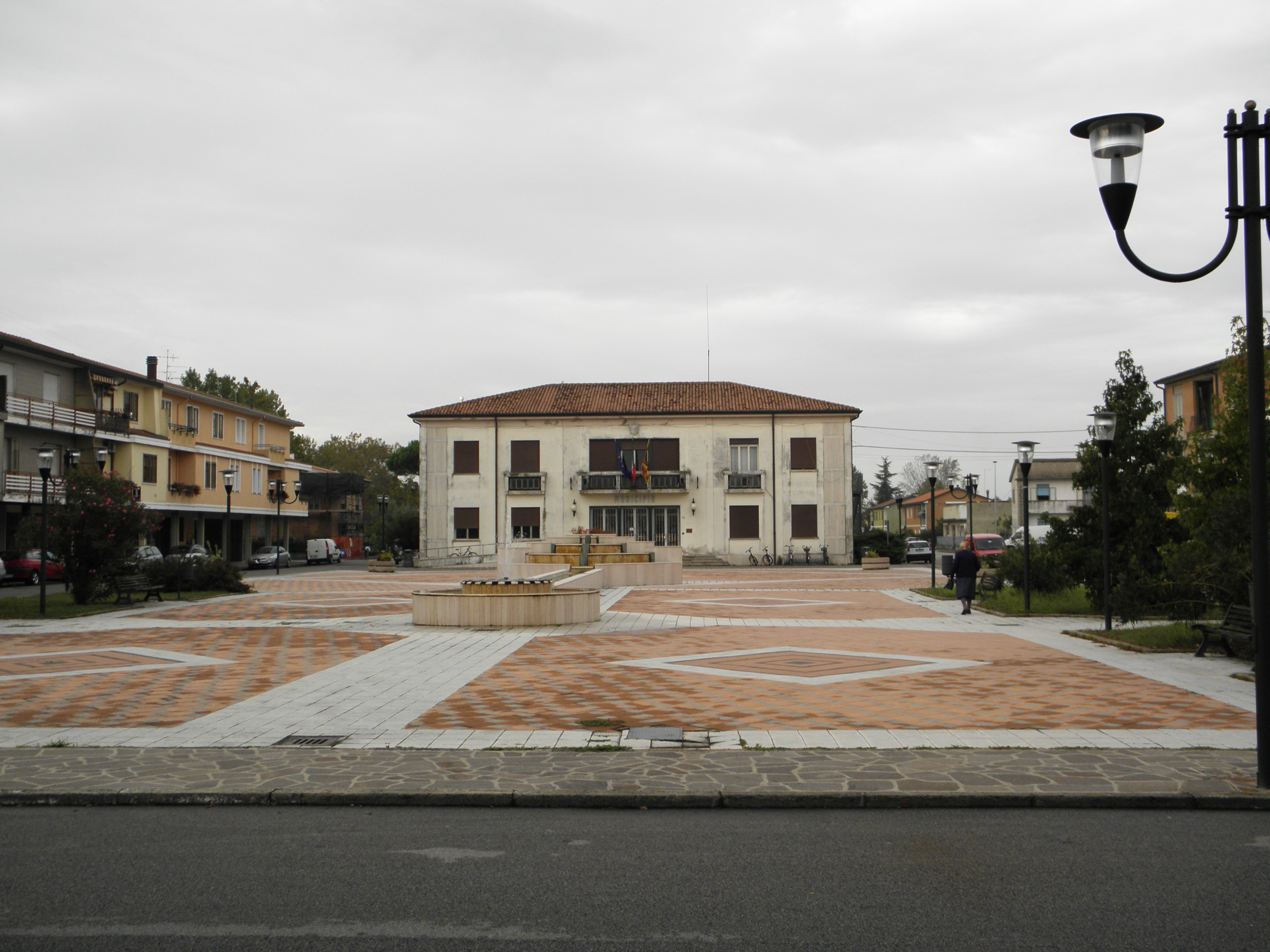
- Town hall.

- Coat of arms

- Location within Italy Location within Veneto
- Coordinates: 44°59′N 12°2′E
- Country: Italy
- Region: Veneto
- Province: Rovigo (RO)
- Frazioni: Arginone, Borgo, Braglia, Campagnola, Corte Fustignona, Curicchi, La Bissara, Le Motte, Marcanta, Panarella, Santi

Government
  - Mayor: Pierluigi Mosca

Area
  - Total: 21.49 km^{2} (8.30 sq mi)

Population (31 December 2017)
  - Total: 1,455
  - Density: 67.71/km^{2} (175.4/sq mi)
- Demonym: Papozzani
- Time zone: UTC+1 (CET)
  - Summer (DST): UTC+2 (CEST)
- Postal code: 45010
- Dialing code: 0426
- Website: Official website

Papozze is a comune (municipality) in the Province of Rovigo in the Italian region Veneto, located about 50 kilometres (31 mi) southwest of Venice and about 20 kilometres (12 mi) southeast of Rovigo.

Papozze borders the following municipalities: Adria, Ariano nel Polesine, Berra, Corbola, Villanova Marchesana.
