= Goro, Emilia–Romagna =

Italian comune

Goro
- Comune
- Comune di Goro
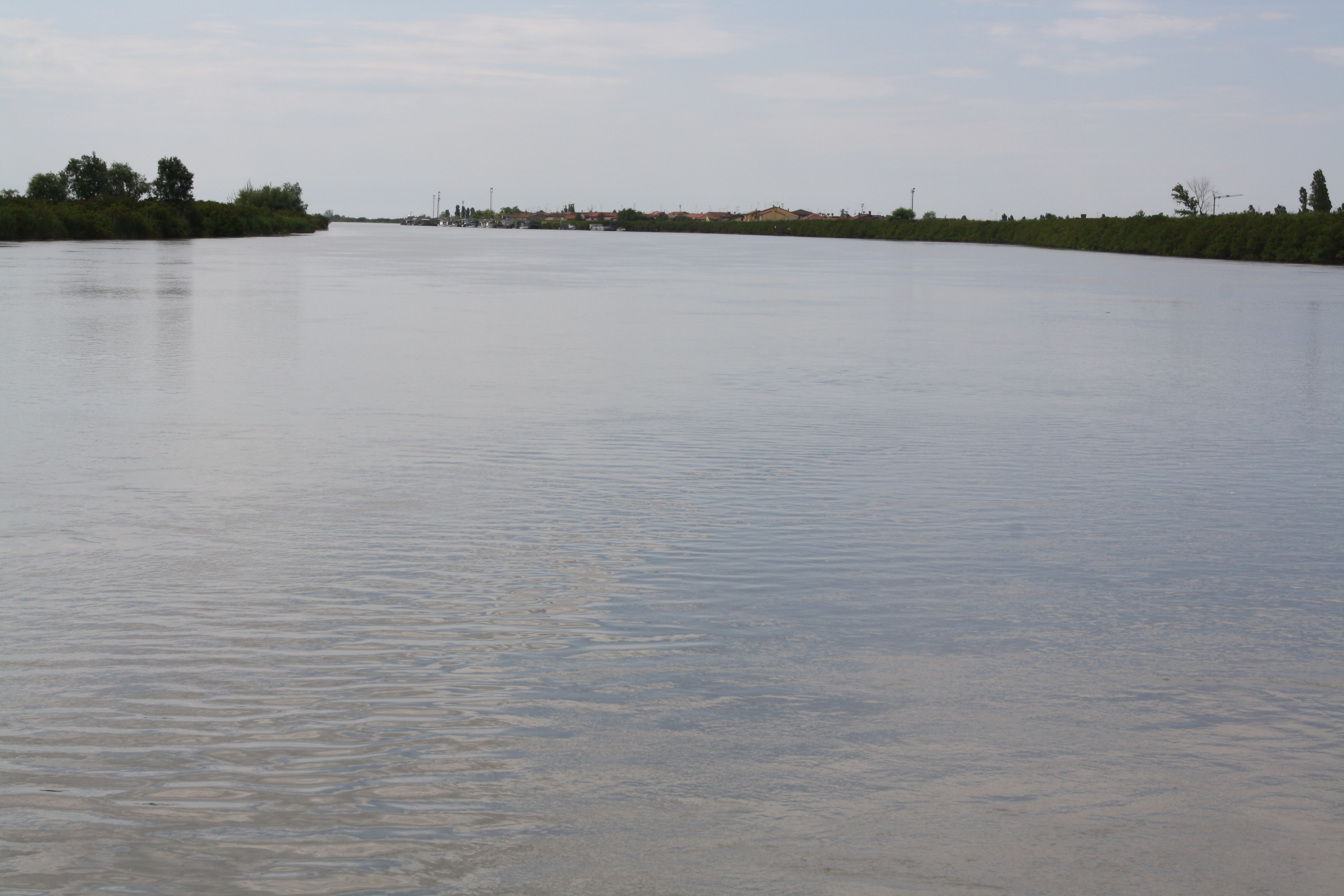
- A view of Pò di Goro in the municipality of Goro

- Flag Coat of arms

- Location within Italy Location within Emilia-Romagna
- Coordinates: 44°51′N 12°18′E
- Country: Italy
- Region: Emilia-Romagna
- Province: Ferrara (FE)
- Frazioni: Gorino

Government
  - Mayor: Diego Viviani

Area
  - Total: 33.18 km^{2} (12.81 sq mi)
- Elevation: 1 m (3.3 ft)

Population (31 August 2017)
  - Total: 3,733
  - Density: 112.5/km^{2} (291.4/sq mi)
- Demonym: Goresi
- Time zone: UTC+1 (CET)
  - Summer (DST): UTC+2 (CEST)
- Postal code: 44020
- Dialing code: 0532
- Website: Official website

Goro (Ferrarese: Gòr, but locally Goro) is a comune (municipality) in the Province of Ferrara in the Italian region Emilia-Romagna, located about 80 kilometres (50 mi) northeast of Bologna and about 50 kilometres (31 mi) east of Ferrara, near the mouth of the Po River.

Goro borders the following municipalities: Ariano nel Polesine, Codigoro, Mesola.

== Twin towns ==
- Pontinia, Italy

== Important people ==
- Romualdo Rossi (1877-1968) writer, editor and journalist.
- Milva (1939–2021) singer, stage and film actress, and television personality.
- Piergiorgio Farina (1933–2008) jazz violinist, composer and singer.
