= Australis =

Australis (Latin for southern or of the south) may refer to:

== Science and technology ==
- Australis, codename for an updated interface of Mozilla Firefox web browser
- Australis II, an Australian Bureau of Meteorology supercomputer
- Australis (elm hybrid), a type of tree
- Commelina virginica L. var. australis, a synonym for Commelina erecta
- Terra Australis, or Australis, a hypothetical continent used on 15th–18th century maps

== Transportation ==
- Australis Motors, an Australian automobile manufactured from 1897 to 1907
- SS America (1940), a passenger ship that sailed under the name Australis from 1964 to 1978

== Other uses ==
- Australis, the Latin derivation of the name of Australia, the country
- Australis, a type of enemy in the video game Dino Crisis 3
- Australis, a brand of cosmetics created in Australia by the Gance brothers, who later founded Chemist Warehouse
- Australis (musical project), the new age music Chemist Warehouse project created in 2004 by Oscar Aguayo
- Australis Aquaculture, a sustainable seafood company based in Turners Falls, Massachusetts
- Australis Media, a former group participating in the Galaxy television channel

== See also ==
- Aurora Australis, also known as the Southern Lights
