= Ulmus 'Australis' =

Elm cultivar

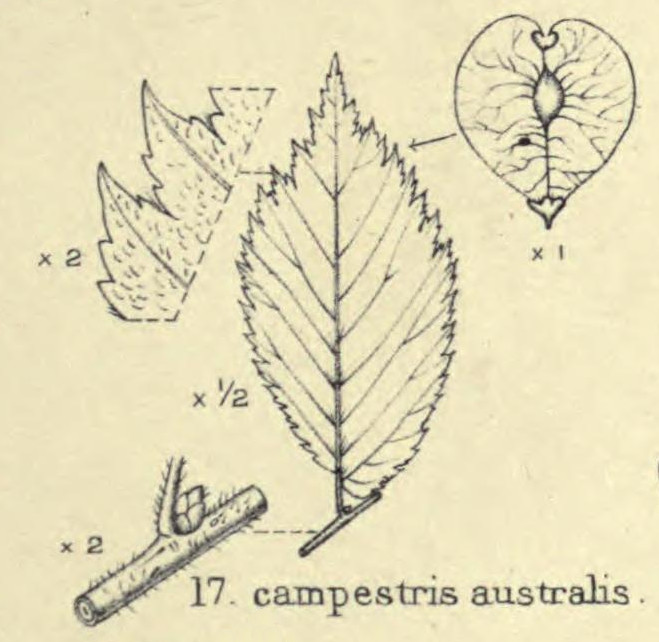
- Genus: Ulmus
- Cultivar: 'Australis' Henry
- Origin: Europe

The elm cultivar Ulmus 'Australis' [: southern], reputedly endemic to south-eastern France, Switzerland and Italy, is a little-known tree first described by Augustine Henry in 1913, and considered by various authorities to have been a variety of Ulmus minor or Ulmus × hollandica.

'Australis' is not to be confused with Loudon's U. glabra Huds. 'Australis', a variety of Wych Elm.

== Description ==
The tree is distinguished by its conspicuously and numerously veined oval leathery leaves measuring 2 inches (5.1 cm) to 3 inches (7.6 cm) in length by 1.25 inches (3.2 cm) to 1.75 inches (4.4 cm) in width and with a petiole up to .25 inches (0.64 cm) long. Henry's 1912 herbarium specimen from La Mortola, however, has a less cuspidate, field-elm type leaf.

== Cultivation ==
Henry described as var. australis the oldest in the lines of elms along the Cours-la-Reine in Rouen, planted in 1649 by the Duc de Longueville, several of which were still alive in 1912, having attained a height of about 90 feet (27 m). He also mentioned specimens growing in botanical gardens at Le Mans and Bordeaux. "Similar" elms growing as far south as Spizza (now Sutomore) in Dalmatia (Montenegro) he labelled var. dalmatica Baldacci, a name, however, once used at Kew for U. minor subsp. canescens.

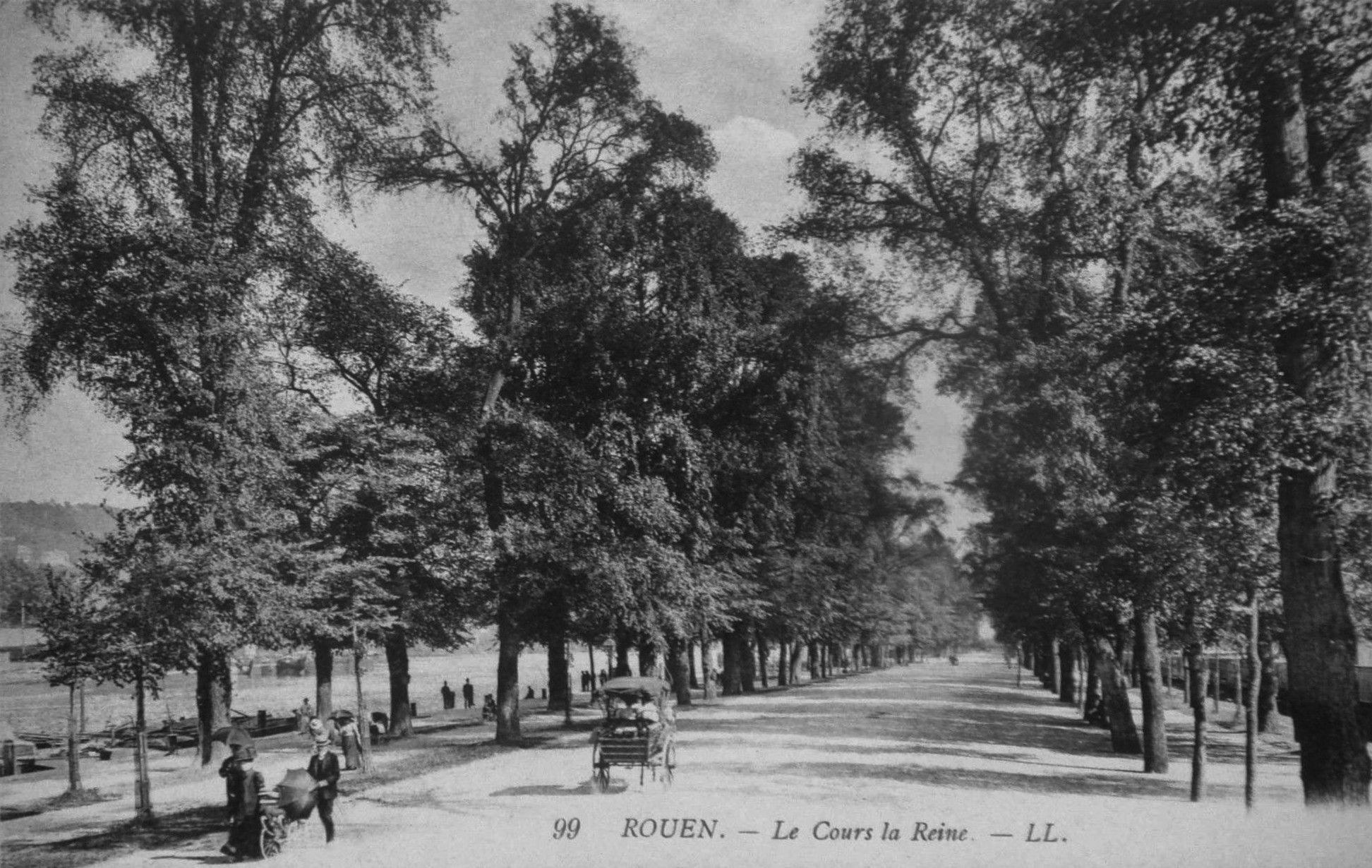
Rouen, Le Cours la Reine, c.1900, showing the 'Australis' mentioned by Elwes & Henry.

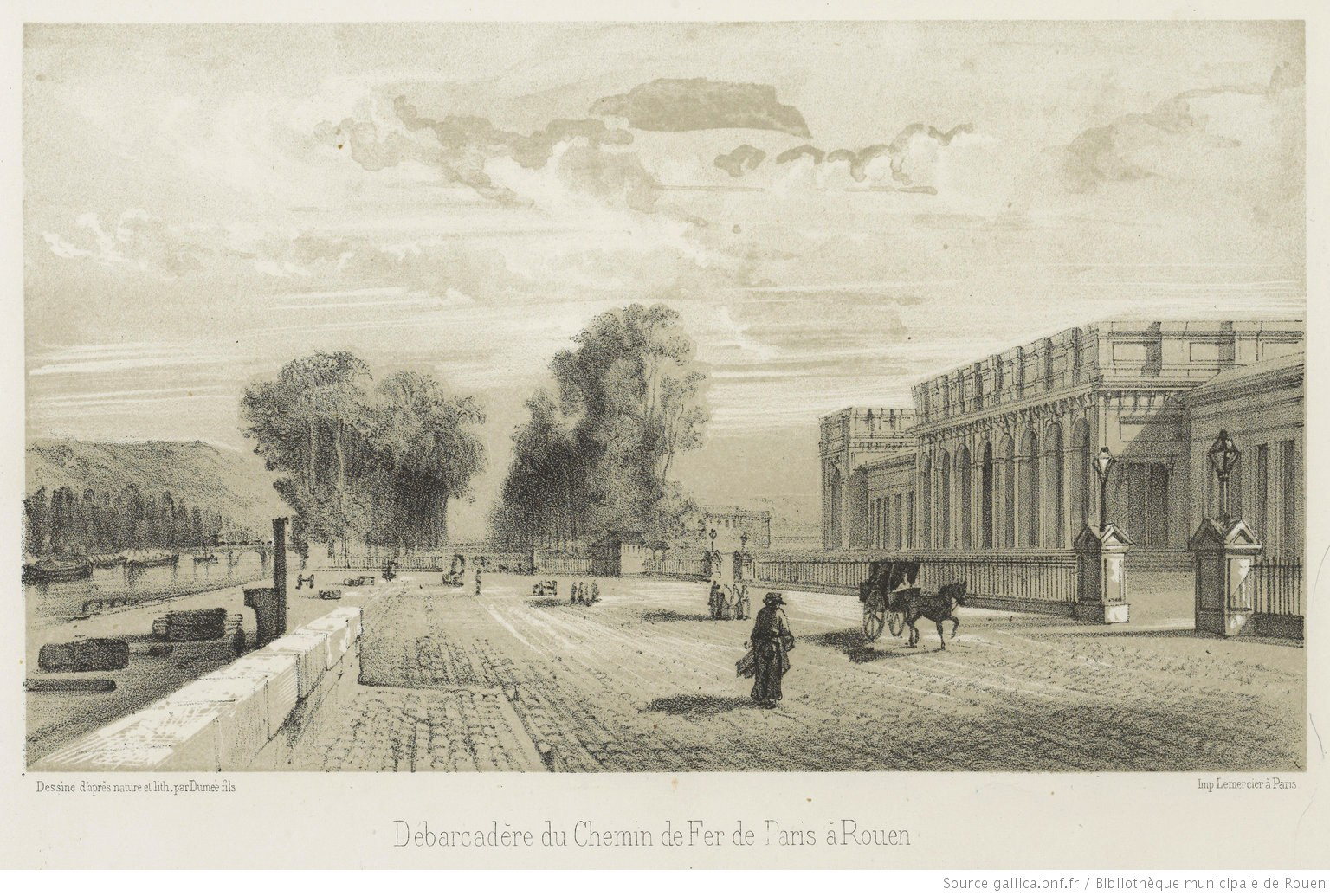
Same, in their heyday, 1840s

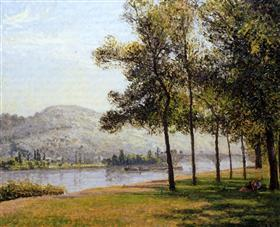
Same, by Camille Pissarro, 1898

An Ulmus × hollandica 'Australis' was propagated and marketed in the UK by the Hillier & Sons nursery, Winchester, Hampshire from 1970 to 1977 when production ceased; however none were ever sold. Hilliers considered their hybrid 'Australis' synonymous with Henry's U. minor var. italica, but Henry distinguished between the two, his var. italica having twice as many vein-pairs as his var. australis.

Neither 'Australis' is known to survive in cultivation.

== Synonymy ==
- Ulmus campestris (: procera Salisb.) var. australis.
- Ulmus × hollandica 'Australis': Hilliers' Manual of Trees & Shrubs, ed. 4, p. 400, 1977, name in synonymy.
- Ulmus minor 'Italica': Hilliers' Manual of Trees & Shrubs, ed. 4, p. 400, 1977, name in synonymy.
