= Castelguglielmo =

- Comune
- Comune di Castelguglielmo
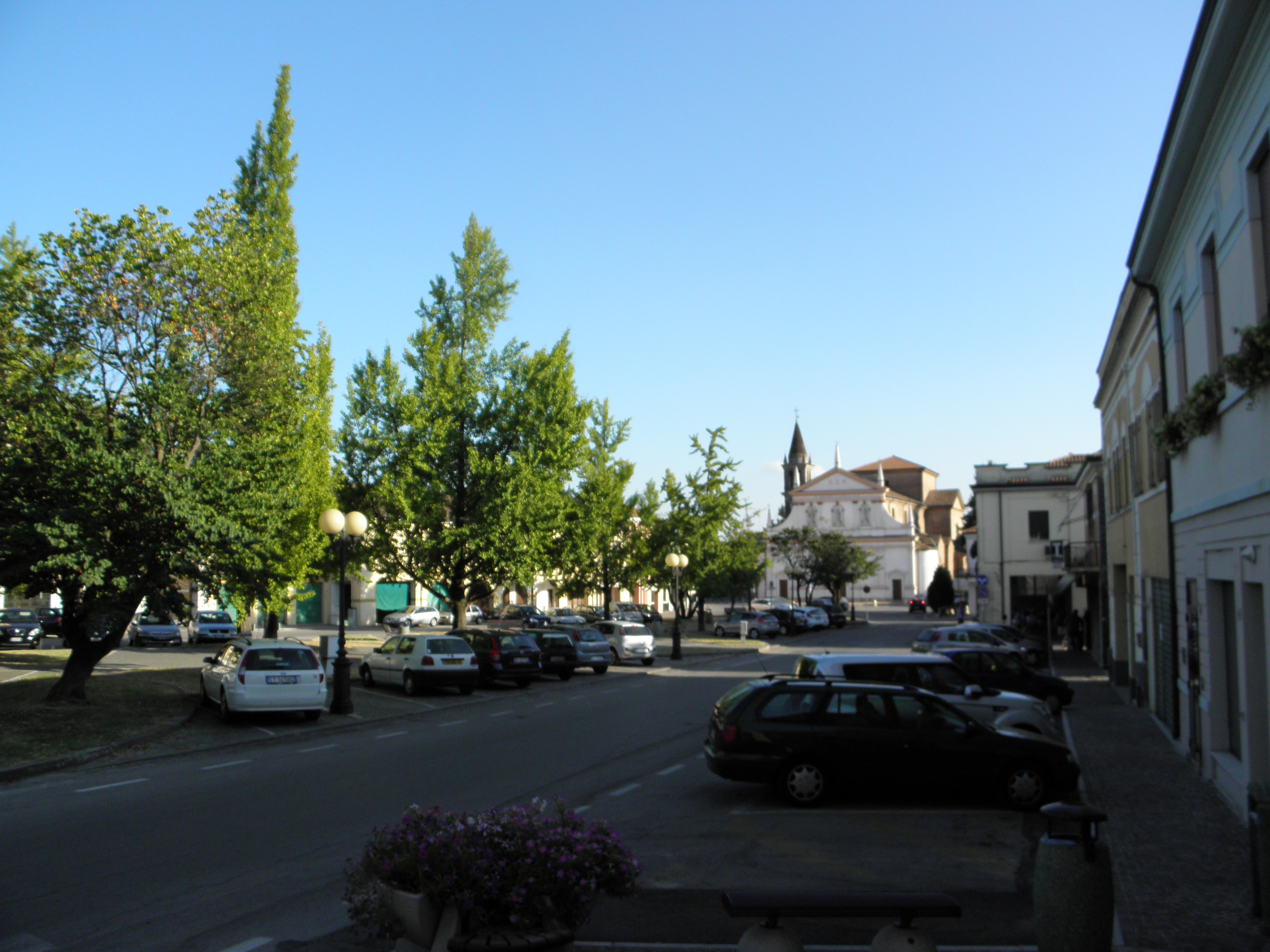
- Vittorio Veneto Square

- Location within Italy Location within Veneto
- Coordinates: 45°1′N 11°32′E
- Country: Italy
- Region: Veneto
- Province: Province of Rovigo (RO)
- Frazioni: Bressane, Canda, Franceschetta, Le Basse, Precona, Presciane

Area
  - Total: 22.1 km^{2} (8.5 sq mi)
- Elevation: 9 m (30 ft)

Population (Dec. 2004)
  - Total: 1,730
  - Density: 78.3/km^{2} (203/sq mi)
- Demonym: Castelguglielmesi
- Time zone: UTC+1 (CET)
  - Summer (DST): UTC+2 (CEST)
- Postal code: 45020
- Dialing code: 0425

Castelguglielmo is a comune (municipality) in the Province of Rovigo in the Italian region Veneto, located about 80 kilometres (50 mi) southwest of Venice and about 20 kilometres (12 mi) southwest of Rovigo. As of 31 December 2004, it had a population of 1,730 and an area of 22.1 square kilometres (8.5 mi^{2}).

The municipality of Castelguglielmo contains the frazioni (subdivisions, mainly villages and hamlets) Bressane, Canda, Franceschetta, Le Basse, Precona, and Presciane.

Castelguglielmo borders the following municipalities: Bagnolo di Po, Canda, Fiesso Umbertiano, Lendinara, Pincara, San Bellino, Stienta.

== Demographic evolution ==
Historical population

| Year | Pop. | ±% |
|---|---|---|
| 1861 | ? | — |
| 1871 | 3,052 | — |
| 1881 | 3,293 | +7.9% |
| 1901 | 3,032 | −7.9% |
| 1911 | 3,315 | +9.3% |

| Year | Pop. | ±% |
|---|---|---|
| 1921 | 3,523 | +6.3% |
| 1931 | 3,826 | +8.6% |
| 1936 | 4,085 | +6.8% |
| 1951 | 4,106 | +0.5% |
| 1961 | 2,690 | −34.5% |

| Year | Pop. | ±% |
|---|---|---|
| 1971 | 2,212 | −17.8% |
| 1981 | 2,075 | −6.2% |
| 1991 | 1,965 | −5.3% |
| 2001 | 1,763 | −10.3% |

Source: Data from ISTAT
