= San Bellino =

- Comune
- Comune di San Bellino
- Location within Italy Location within Veneto
- Coordinates: 45°2′N 11°35′E
- Country: Italy
- Region: Veneto
- Province: Province of Rovigo (RO)
- Frazioni: Borgo di Mezzo, Borgo Due Spade, Borgo Vespara, Ca'moro-Dona, Ca'Peretto, Case Nuove, Passarara, Presciane, Treponti

Area
  - Total: 15.8 km^{2} (6.1 sq mi)
- Elevation: 7 m (23 ft)

Population (Dec. 2006)
  - Total: 1,340
  - Density: 84.8/km^{2} (220/sq mi)
- Time zone: UTC+1 (CET)
  - Summer (DST): UTC+2 (CEST)
- Postal code: 45020
- Dialing code: 04505
- Website: Official website

San Bellino is a comune (municipality) in the Province of Rovigo in the Italian region Veneto, located about 73 kilometres (45 mi) southwest of Venice and about 15 kilometres (9 mi) west of Rovigo.

Its Basilica di S. Bellino is a minor basilica by immemorial decree and its parish church in the Roman Catholic Diocese of Adria-Rovigo.

Shares with Castelguglielmo, to being the home of the second largest solar park in Italy: the 70 MW_{p} San Bellino Photovoltaic Power Plant.

== Geography ==
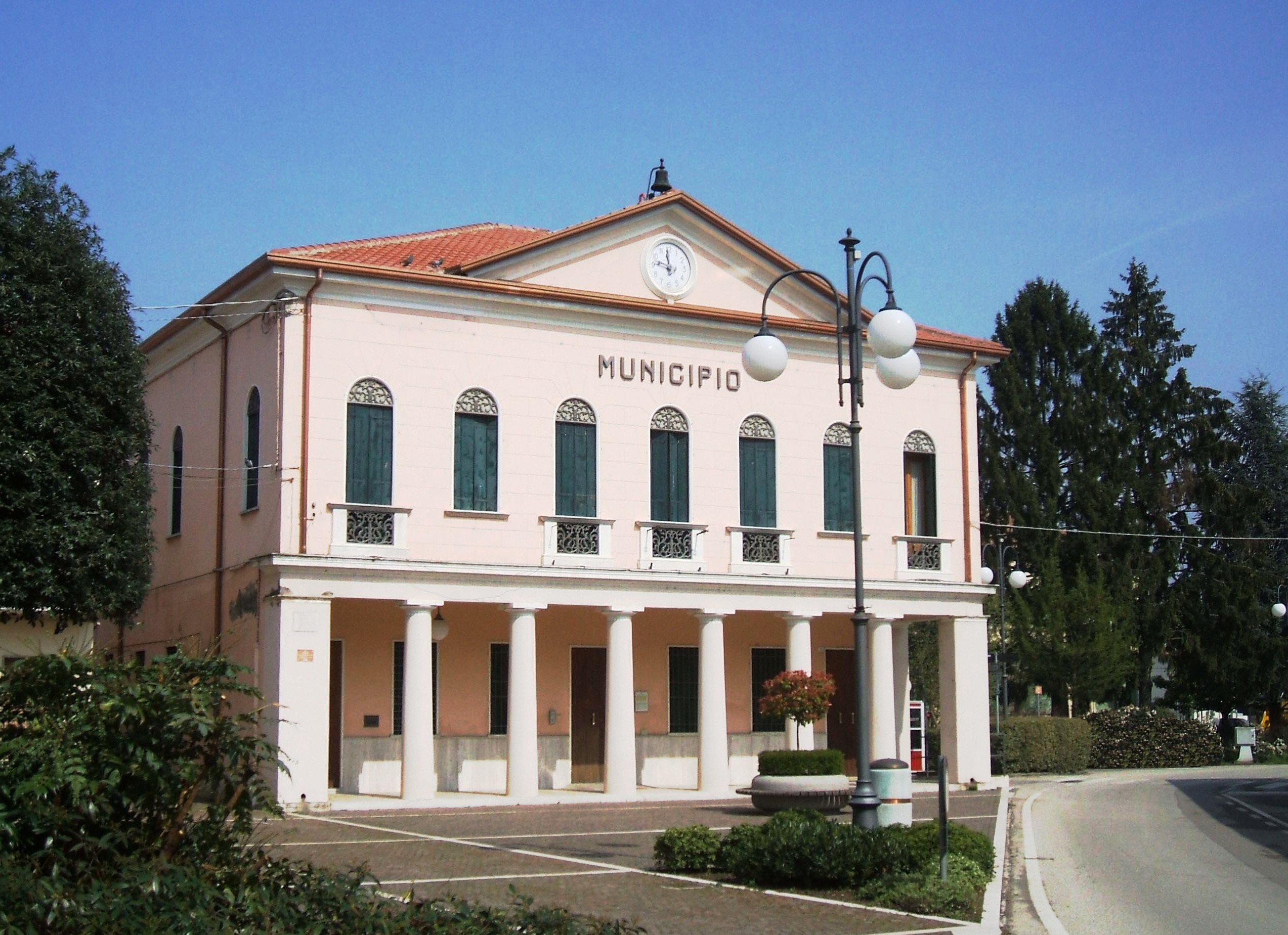
Picture of San Bellino Town House

The municipality of San Bellino contains the frazioni (subdivisions, mainly villages and hamlets) Borgo di Mezzo, Borgo Due Spade, Borgo Vespara, Ca'moro-Dona, Ca'Peretto, Case Nuove, Passarara, Presciane and Treponti.

San Bellino borders the following municipalities: Castelguglielmo, Fratta Polesine, Lendinara and Pincara.

== Statistics ==
As of 31 December 2004, it had a population of 1,198 and an area of 15.8 square kilometres (6.1 mi^{2}).

=== Demographic evolution ===
Historical population

Year	Pop.	±%
1861	?	—
1871	1,680	—
1881	1,807	+7.6%
1901	1,653	−8.5%
1911	1,795	+8.6%

Year	Pop.	±%
1921	1,900	+5.8%
1931	2,102	+10.6%
1936	2,278	+8.4%
1951	2,348	+3.1%
1961	1,722	−26.7%

Year	Pop.	±%
1971	1,423	−17.4%
1981	1,319	−7.3%
1991	1,243	−5.8%
2001	1,197	−3.7%

Source: Data from ISTAT

== Sources and external links ==
- www.comune.sanbellino.ro.it/
- GCatholic San Bellino basilica
