= Enrico Ferrarese =

Italian politician (born 1979)

President of the Province of Rovigo
- Incumbent
- Assumed office 19 December 2021
- Preceded by: Ivan Dall'Ara

Mayor of Stienta
- Incumbent
- Assumed office 6 June 2016
- Preceded by: Cristiano Corazzari

Personal details
- Born: 7 January 1979 (age 47) Ferrara, Italy
- Party: Liga Veneta–Lega
- Education: University of Ferrara
- Profession: Lawyer

Enrico Ferrarese (born 7 January 1979) is an Italian lawyer and politician who has served as president of the Province of Rovigo since 2021.

== Life and career ==
Ferrarese graduated in law from the University of Ferrara in 2009 and qualified as a lawyer through the Court of Appeal of Venice in 2014. During his studies, he also completed a public administration internship with the Municipality of Canaro in the province of Rovigo. Before entering the legal profession, he worked in technical and legal consultancy and in the hospitality sector. Since 2014, he has practised as a lawyer in Rovigo, specializing in civil and administrative law.

He entered local politics in Stienta in June 2014, when he was elected municipal councillor. During that administrative term, he served as assessor and deputy mayor. In June 2016, he was elected mayor of Stienta with the civic list "Stienta Tua", and was re-elected in October 2021.

Ferrarese was elected president of the Province of Rovigo in December 2021, supported by a broad coalition including the Lega and civic groups, with support also from parts of the centre-left local administration. He received 59,962 weighted votes, defeating Gian Pietro Rizzatello, mayor of Costa di Rovigo, who obtained 26,682 weighted votes.

He was re-elected president of the Province of Rovigo in February 2026. Supported by the centre-right coalition, including the Lega, Forza Italia and Brothers of Italy, Ferrarese obtained 56,004 weighted votes, equal to 72.23% of the valid votes, defeating his opponent, Elena Paolizzi, mayor of Bosaro, who received 25,379 votes, equal to 22.92%.
