= Fiesso Umbertiano =

- Comune
- Comune di Fiesso Umbertiano
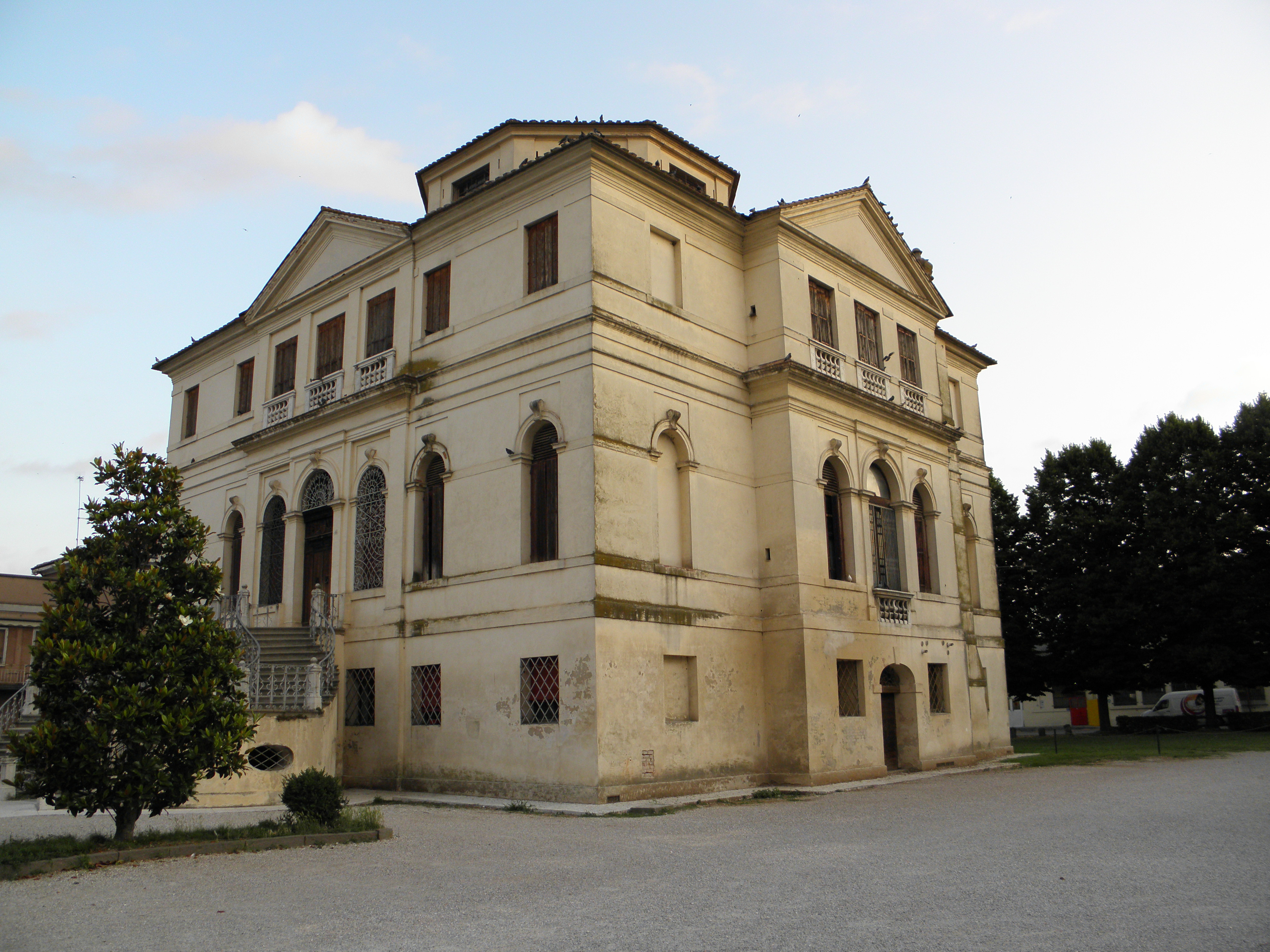
- Villa Morosini Vendramin Calergi, actually the Town Hall

- Location within Italy Location within Veneto
- Coordinates: 44°58′N 11°36′E
- Country: Italy
- Region: Veneto
- Province: Province of Rovigo (RO)
- Frazioni: Fornace Carotta, La Foscarina, Roncala

Area
  - Total: 27.3 km^{2} (10.5 sq mi)

Population (Dec. 2004)
  - Total: 4,207
  - Density: 154/km^{2} (399/sq mi)
- Time zone: UTC+1 (CET)
  - Summer (DST): UTC+2 (CEST)
- Postal code: 45024
- Dialing code: 0425

Fiesso Umbertiano is a comune (municipality) in the Province of Rovigo in the Italian region Veneto, located about 80 kilometres (50 mi) southwest of Venice and about 20 kilometres (12 mi) southwest of Rovigo. As of 31 December 2004, it had a population of 4,207 and an area of 27.3 square kilometres (10.5 mi^{2}).

The municipality of Fiesso Umbertiano contains the frazioni (subdivisions, mainly villages and hamlets) Fornace Carotta, La Foscarina, Roncala, Capitello and Piacentina.

Fiesso Umbertiano borders the following municipalities: Canaro, Castelguglielmo, Frassinelle Polesine, Occhiobello, Pincara, Stienta.

== Demographic evolution ==
Historical population

Year	Pop.	±%
1861	?	—
1871	4,111	—
1881	4,245	+3.3%
1901	4,007	−5.6%
1911	4,885	+21.9%

Year	Pop.	±%
1921	5,199	+6.4%
1931	5,764	+10.9%
1936	6,166	+7.0%
1951	6,344	+2.9%
1961	4,799	−24.4%

Year	Pop.	±%
1971	4,194	−12.6%
1981	4,150	−1.0%
1991	4,135	−0.4%
2001	4,177	+1.0%

Source: Data from ISTAT
