= List of presidents of the Province of Rovigo =

President of the Province of Rovigo
- Presidente della Provincia di Rovigo
- Incumbent; Enrico Ferrarese since 19 December 2021
- Term length: 4 years
- Inaugural holder: Adolfo Benvenuti
- Formation: 1889

The president of the Province of Rovigo is the head of the provincial government in Rovigo, Veneto, Italy. The president oversees the administration of the province, coordinates the activities of the municipalities, and represents the province in regional and national matters.

Since December 2021, the office has been held by Enrico Ferrarese of Lega.

== List ==
=== Presidents of the Provincial Deputation (1889–1926) ===
No.	Portrait	Name	Term of office		Party
No.	Portrait	Name	Start	End	Party
1		Adolfo Benvenuti	1889	1893	
2		Gaetano Arcangeli	1893	1895	
3		Giovanni Battista Casalini	1895	1899	
4		Illuminato Giri	1899	1904	
5		Pietro Oliva	1904	1908	
6		Carlo Businotto	1908	1909	
7		Leone Vianello	1909	1914	
8		Ugo Casalicchio	1915	?	

=== Presidents of the Provincial Rectorate (1926–1945) ===
No.	Portrait	Name	Term of office		Party
No.	Portrait	Name	Start	End	Party
		Mario Scarpari	1933	1939	National Fascist Party

=== Presidents of the Provincial Deputation (1945–1951) ===
No.	Portrait	Name	Term of office		Party
No.	Portrait	Name	Start	End	Party
1		Alfredo De Polzer	1945	1951	Italian Communist Party

=== Presidents of the Province (1951–present) ===
No.	Portrait	Name	Term of office		Party
No.	Portrait	Name	Start	End	Party
1		Alfredo De Polzer	1951	1961	Italian Communist Party
		Francesco Guindani	1961	1969	Christian Democracy
		Armando Giolo	1969	?	?
		?	?	?	?
		Valentino Lodo	1975	1976	Italian Communist Party
–		?	?	?	Special commissioner
		Valentino Lodo	1977	1980	Italian Communist Party
		Giorgio Nonnato	1980	1989	Italian Socialist Party
		Riccardo Monesi	15 February 1989	4 May 1991	Italian Socialist Party
		Alberto Brigo	4 May 1991	8 May 1995	Christian Democracy; Italian People's Party
		Alberto Brigo	8 May 1995	29 March 1999	Christian Democracy; Italian People's Party
–		Francesco Guagliata	29 March 1999	1 July 1999	Special commissioner
		Federico Saccardin	1 July 1999	14 June 2004	Italian People's Party; The Daisy
		Federico Saccardin	14 June 2004	26 June 2009	Italian People's Party; The Daisy
		Tiziana Virgili	26 June 2009	14 October 2014	Democratic Party
		Marco Trombini	14 October 2014	31 October 2018	Forza Italia
		Ivan Dall'Ara	31 October 2018	19 December 2021	Independent (centre-right)
		Enrico Ferrarese	19 December 2021	2 February 2026	Lega
		Enrico Ferrarese	2 February 2026	Incumbent	Lega

== Sources ==
- "Storia amministrativa dell'ente". Ministero dell'Interno.
- Agostini, Filiberto (2012). Il governo locale nel Veneto all'indomani della liberazione. Milan: FrancoAngeli.
- Menichini, Piera (2005). "I presidenti delle Province dall'Unità alla Grande guerra: repertorio analitico". Storia Amministrazione Costituzione (13): 285–286.
