= Ulmus glabra 'Australis' =

Elm cultivar

- Species: Ulmus glabra
- Cultivar: 'Australis'
- Origin: England

Ulmus glabra 'Australis' is a Wych Elm cultivar described by Loudon in 1838, from a tree in the Royal Horticultural Society garden, as U. montana var. australis Hort..

Loudon's 'Australis' is not to be confused with Henry's U. campestris 'Australis', a tall southern European field elm or hybrid cultivar with an oval leaf and longer petiole.

== Description ==
Loudon said the variety had "rather smaller leaves, and a more pendulous habit, than the species", but did "not appear to be different in any other respect".

== Pests and diseases ==
See under Ulmus glabra.

== Cultivation ==
No specimens are known to survive, though wych elms of a similar type sometimes occur among avenue and park plantings in Edinburgh.

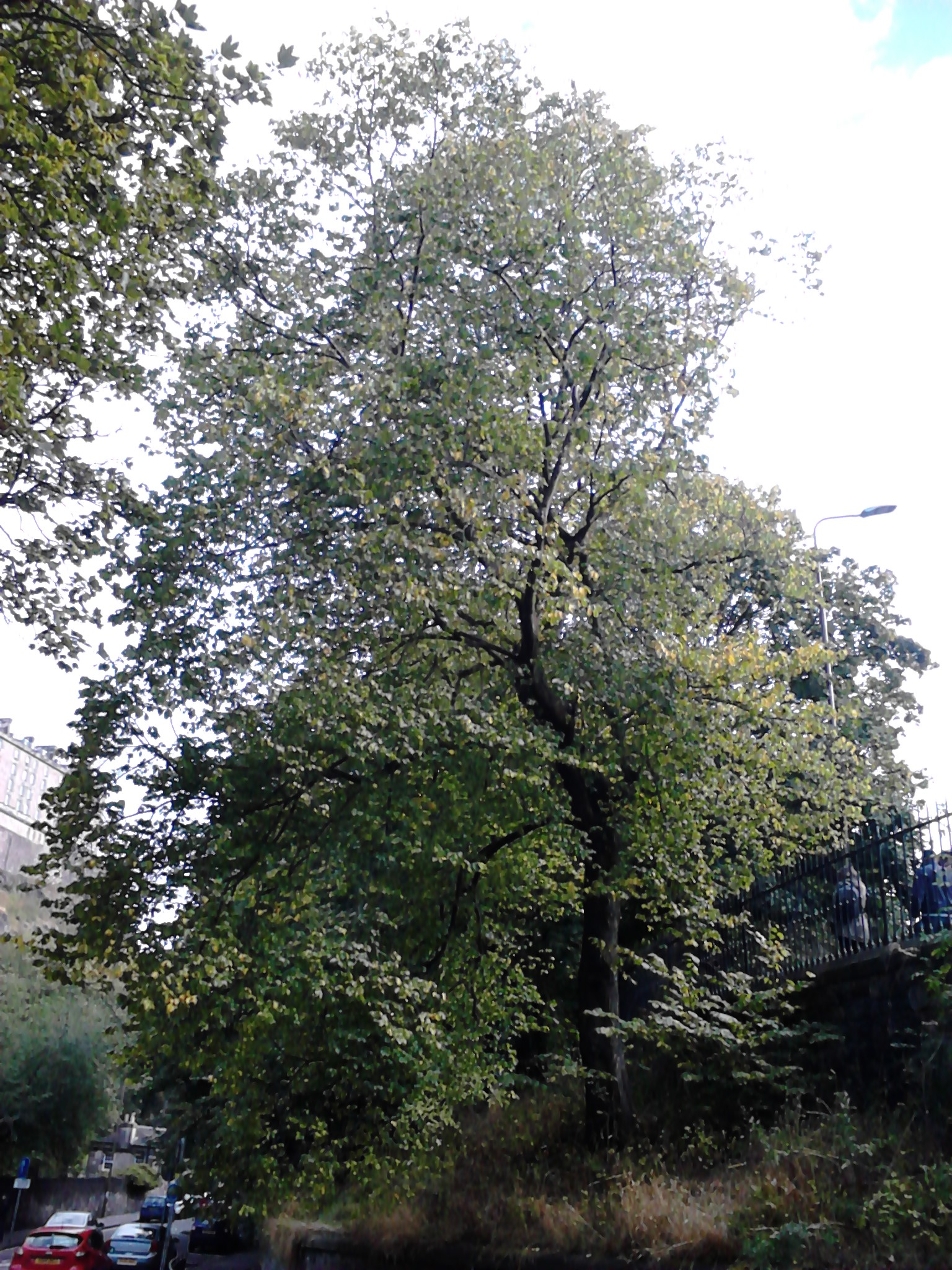
Small-leaved, rather pendulous wych, King's Stables Road, Edinburgh

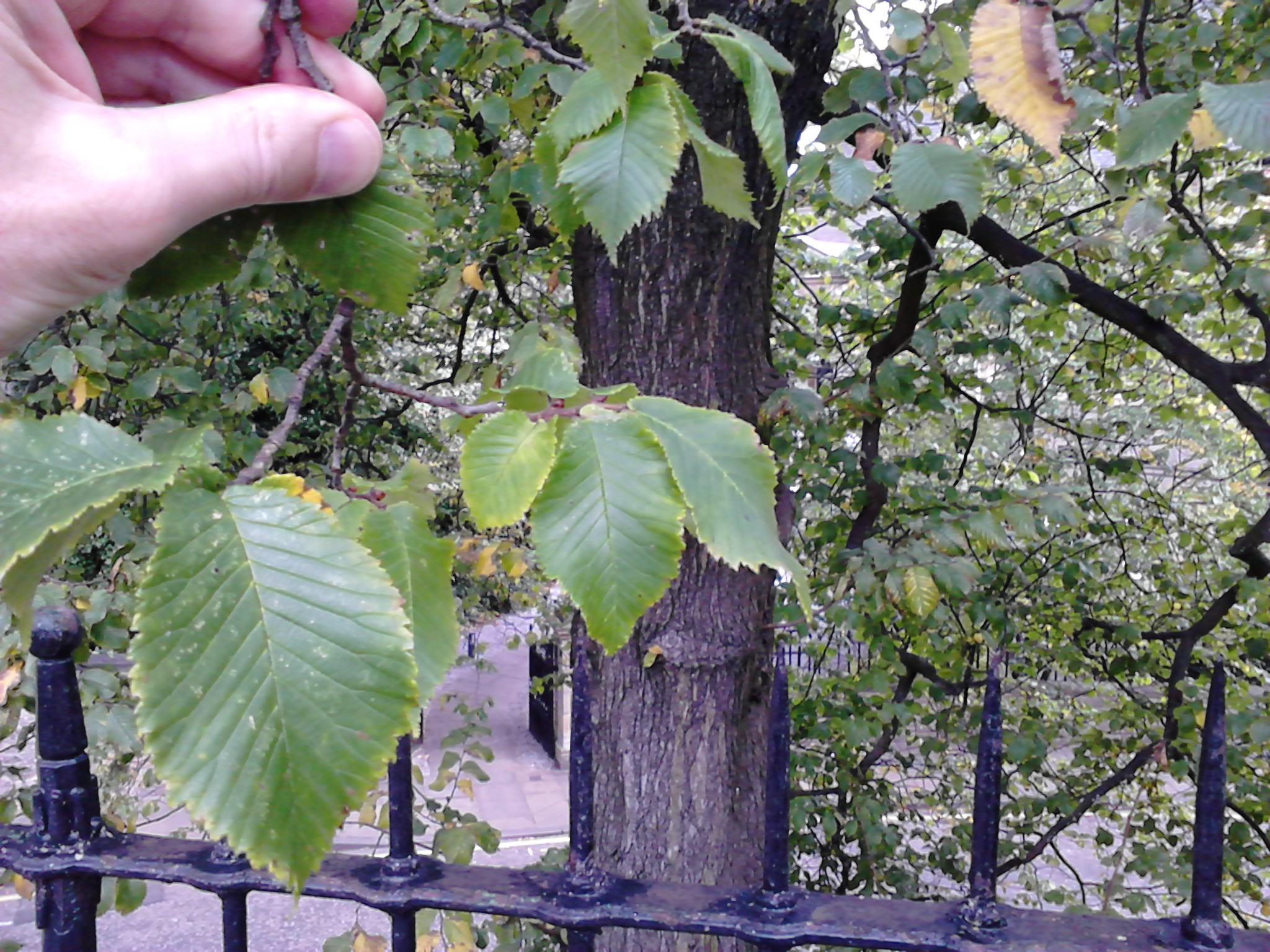
Leaves of same, from Castle Terrace

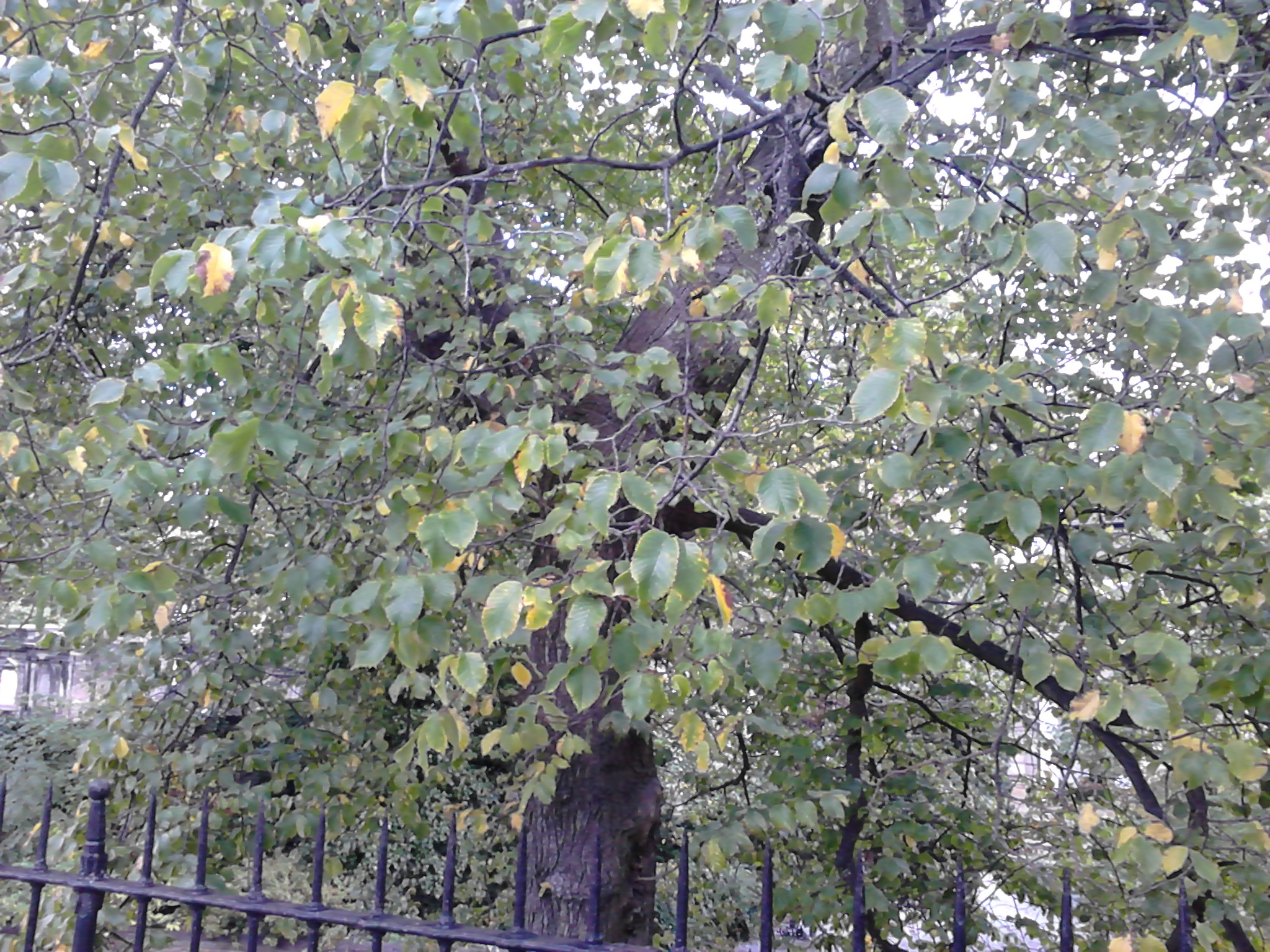
Foliage

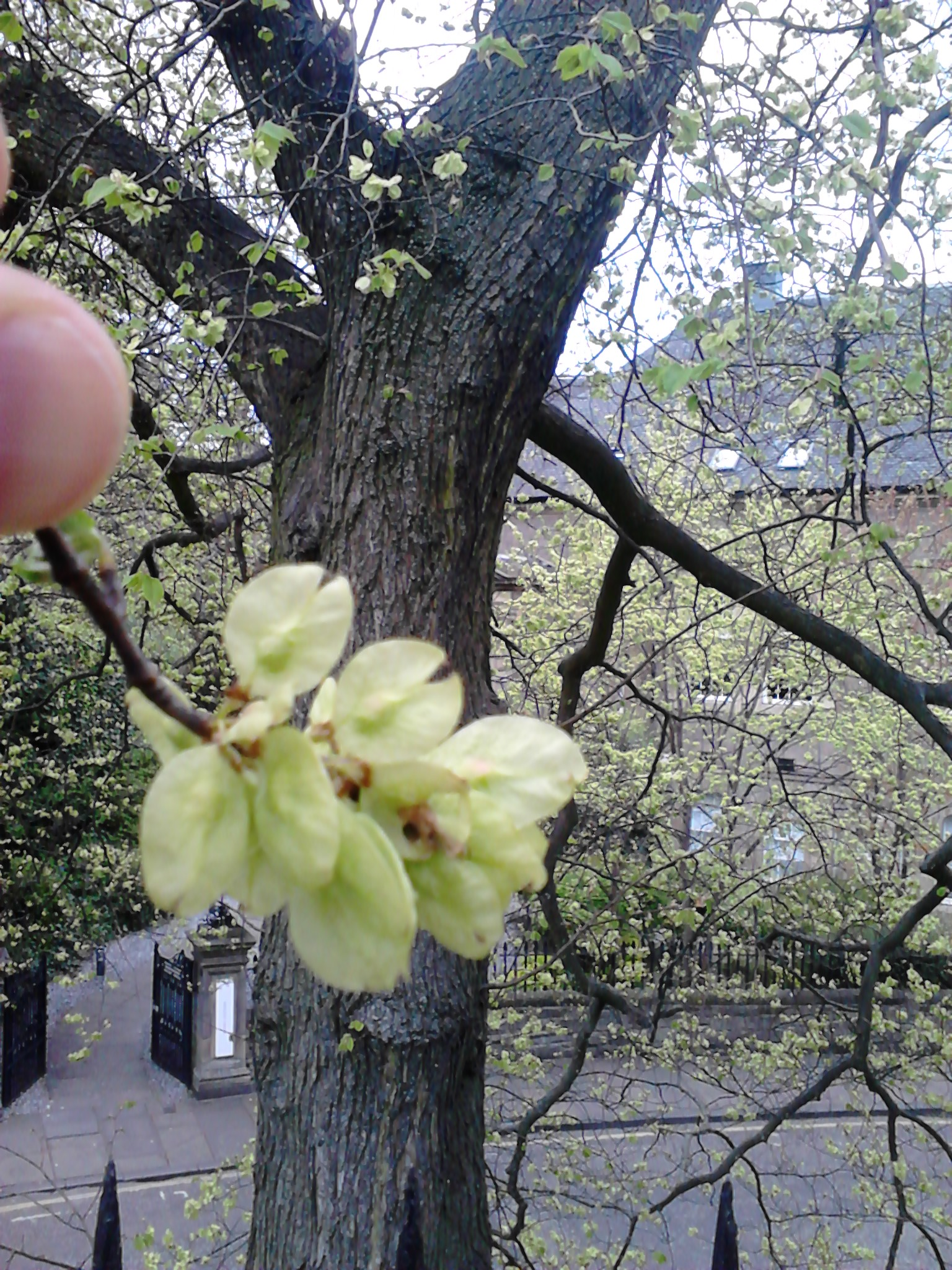
Smallish samarae
