= Stienta =

- Comune
- Comune di Stienta
- Location within Italy Location within Veneto
- Coordinates: 44°56′N 11°33′E
- Country: Italy
- Region: Veneto
- Province: Province of Rovigo (RO)
- Frazioni: Argine Sabato, Argine Valle Est, Argine Valle Ovest, Beccari, Bentivoglio, Boaria Gilliola, Boaria Guerra, Boaria Roveta, Boaria Val dell'Oca e Casetta, Boaria Val di Mezzo, Boaria Varotta, Brigo, Chiavicone, Fazzenda, Folega, Guratti, Ponte Favarzano, Prati Nuovi, Sabbioni, Zampine

Government
  - Mayor: Enrico Ferrarese

Area
  - Total: 24.1 km^{2} (9.3 sq mi)

Population (Dec. 2004)
  - Total: 3,118
  - Density: 129/km^{2} (335/sq mi)
- Demonym: Stientesi
- Time zone: UTC+1 (CET)
  - Summer (DST): UTC+2 (CEST)
- Postal code: 45039
- Dialing code: 0425
- Website: Official website

Stienta is a comune (municipality) in the Province of Rovigo in the Italian region Veneto, located about 80 kilometres (50 mi) southwest of Venice and about 25 kilometres (16 mi) southwest of Rovigo. As of 31 December 2004, it had a population of 3,118 and an area of 24.1 square kilometres (9.3 mi^{2}).

The municipality of Stienta contains the frazioni (subdivisions, mainly villages and hamlets) Argine Sabato, Argine Valle Est, Argine Valle Ovest, Beccari, Bentivoglio, Boaria Gilliola, Boaria Guerra, Boaria Roveta, Boaria Val dell'Oca e Casetta, Boaria Val di Mezzo, Boaria Varotta, Brigo, Chiavicone, Fazzenda, Folega, Guratti, Ponte Favarzano, Prati Nuovi, Sabbioni, and Zampine.

Stienta borders the following municipalities: Bagnolo di Po, Castelguglielmo, Ferrara, Fiesso Umbertiano, Gaiba, Occhiobello.

== Demographic evolution ==
Historical population

Year	Pop.	±%
1861	?	—
1871	2,911	—
1881	3,163	+8.7%
1901	3,184	+0.7%
1911	3,644	+14.4%

Year	Pop.	±%
1921	4,001	+9.8%
1931	3,938	−1.6%
1936	4,049	+2.8%
1951	4,142	+2.3%
1961	3,349	−19.1%

Year	Pop.	±%
1971	3,055	−8.8%
1981	3,042	−0.4%
1991	3,004	−1.2%
2001	3,010	+0.2%

Source: Data from ISTAT
