= Tiziana Virgili =

Italian politician and physician (born 1959)

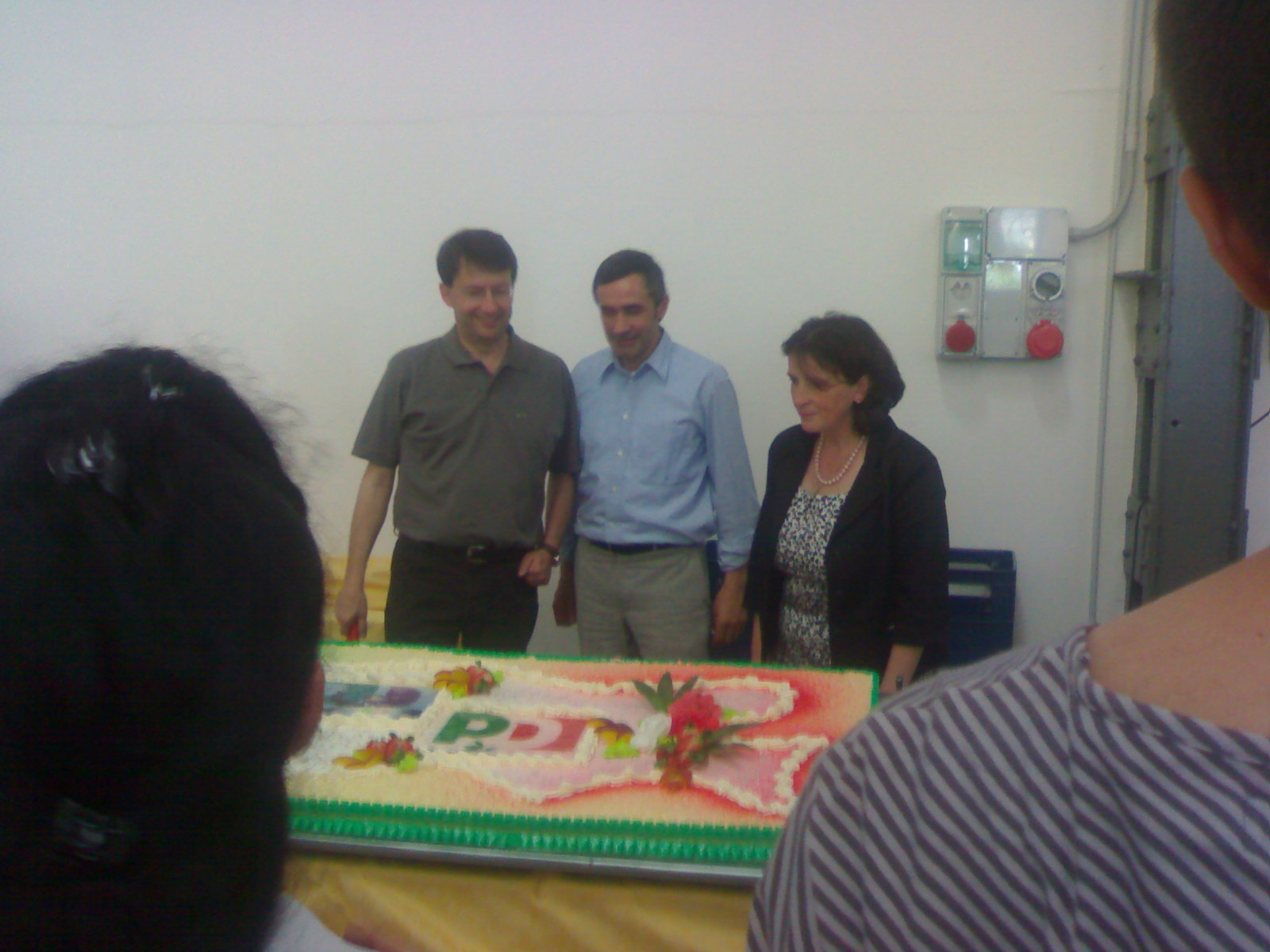
- Dario Franceschini, Gabriele Frigato, and Tiziana Michela Virgili (right) in 2009

President of the Province of Rovigo
- In office 22 June 2009 – 12 October 2014
- Preceded by: Federico Saccardin
- Succeeded by: Marco Trombini

Mayor of Fratta Polesine
- In office 12 June 1994 – 25 May 2002
- Preceded by: Corrado Bolognesi
- Succeeded by: Riccardo Resini
- In office 7 May 2012 – 12 June 2017
- Preceded by: Riccardo Resini
- Succeeded by: Giuseppe Tasso

Personal details
- Born: Tiziana Michela Virgili; 25 April 1959 (age 67) Fratta Polesine, Province of Rovigo, Italy
- Party: Italian People's Party (1994–2002); The Daisy (2002–2007); Democratic Party (2007–2019)
- Education: University of Ferrara
- Occupation: Physician

Tiziana Michela Virgili (born 25 April 1959) is an Italian politician and physician who served as president of the Province of Rovigo from 2009 to 2014 and as mayor of Fratta Polesine for three terms.

== Life and career ==
Virgili was born in Fratta Polesine, in the province of Rovigo, in 1959 and graduated in medicine and surgery from the University of Ferrara.

In 1994, Virgili was elected mayor of Fratta Polesine for the Italian People's Party. She was re-elected in 1998 and remained in office until 2002. In 2004, she became provincial assessor for social services in the administration led by Federico Saccardin.

In the 2009 provincial election, Virgili was the centre-left candidate for president of the Province of Rovigo. She won the runoff on 21 June 2009 against Antonello Contiero, the candidate of the Lega Nord, receiving 52.3% of the vote.

In 2012, Virgili was elected mayor of Fratta Polesine for a third term after ten years.

She subsequently stood as a candidate for the Regional Council of Veneto in the 2015 and 2020 regional elections in the Rovigo constituency, but was not elected. She stood again for mayor of Fratta Polesine in 2017 and 2022, losing on both occasions to Giuseppe Tasso.
