= Alfredo De Polzer =

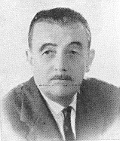

President of the Province of Rovigo
- In office 1945–1961
- Succeeded by: Francesco Guindani

Member of the Chamber of Deputies
- In office 16 May 1963 – 19 March 1965
- Constituency: Veneto

Personal details
- Born: 3 February 1904 Vienna, Austria-Hungary
- Died: 19 March 1965 (aged 61) Bologna, Italy
- Party: Italian Communist Party
- Education: University of Padua
- Occupation: Statistician

Alfredo De Polzer (3 February 1904 – 19 March 1965) was an Italian politician and statistician who served as a member of the Chamber of Deputies from 1963 to 1965 and as president of the Province of Rovigo from 1945 to 1961.
