= Australis Aquaculture =

American seafood company

Australis Aquaculture, LLC is a producer and marketer of ocean-farmed barramundi, headquartered in Greenfield, Massachusetts, which is solely focused on offshore aquaculture, and operates its own barramundi farm in Vietnam. Australis is widely considered responsible for popularizing barramundi in North America.

== History ==
Australis co-founder and CEO Josh Goldman first began experimenting with closed-containment aquaculture in the 1980s while a student at Hampshire College. After graduating, he founded one of the first commercial aquaponics farms, and spend the next fifteen years commercializing closed containment-farming technology as an entrepreneur and consultant. In the early 2000s, Goldman spent three years prospecting for new types of fish to farm and was introduced to barramundi by an Australian entrepreneur. After testing over 30 species of fish in order to determine which was optimal for aquaculture, Goldman chose barramundi because of its low environmental impact, ability to reliably breed in captivity, appealing taste and exceptional nutritional value.

The company was founded in 2004 in Turners Falls, Massachusetts, where it first began producing barramundi using recirculating aquaculture system technology in Western Massachusetts.

Although Australis was able to raise barramundi successfully, one of the largest challenges the company faced was popularizing a relatively unknown fish in the American market. Goldman said: “We were reaching out and building relationships with top chefs who were passionate about sustainability, dietitians who were trying to get people to eat more fish (but often worried about contaminants), and environmentalists whose mission was to protect the oceans.”

In 2004, Australis Aquaculture established its first barramundi farm in Turner Falls, Massachusetts. In 2007, the company expanded its production into Van Phong Bay, in central Vietnam. In September 2018, Australis sold one of its US farms to Great Falls Aquaculture.

== Activities ==
Australis used Recirculating Aquaculture Systems (RAS) technology in its land-based Turner Falls, MA facility to raise barramundi. Australis’ Vietnamese operation uses a combination of on-shore closed containment tanks with off-shore ocean pens.

Australis harvests and processes their fish, selling under its The Better Fish and Clean Harvest brands, as well as private labels. The company’s Vietnamese operations produce primary flash frozen filets and portions which are sold to foodservice distributors and prominent retailers, including the restaurant French Laundry, which first carried Australis Barramundi in 2008, Whole Foods and HelloFresh.

== Environmental impact ==
Part of the barramundi’s sustainability comes from the fact that it can be raised on a predominantly plant-based protein diet without sacrificing the nutritional benefits of the product. According to The Atlantic, “they have the rare ability to transform vegetarian feed into sought-after omega-3 fatty acids. Salmon require as much as three pounds of fish-based feed to put on a pound of meat. Goldman’s barramundi need only half a pound, the bulk of which is made from scraps from a herring processing plant.”

The founder Josh Goldman also launched the venture Greener Grazing he launched to develop Asparagopsis cultures to feed livestock and significantly reduce the associated methane gas emissions. Australis Aquaculture is a longtime partner of the seafood sustainable program Ocean Wise.
