= Pincara =

- Comune
- Comune di Pincara
- Location within Italy Location within Veneto
- Coordinates: 45°0′N 11°37′E
- Country: Italy
- Region: Veneto
- Province: Province of Rovigo (RO)
- Frazioni: Bernarda, Gambaro, Paolino, Romanato, Roncala

Area
  - Total: 17.8 km^{2} (6.9 sq mi)

Population (Dec. 2004)
  - Total: 1,298
  - Density: 72.9/km^{2} (189/sq mi)
- Time zone: UTC+1 (CET)
  - Summer (DST): UTC+2 (CEST)
- Postal code: 45020
- Dialing code: 0425

Pincara is a comune (municipality) in the Province of Rovigo in the Italian region Veneto, located about 70 kilometres (43 mi) southwest of Venice and about 15 kilometres (9 mi) southwest of Rovigo. As of 31 December 2004, it had a population of 1,298 and an area of 17.8 square kilometres (6.9 mi^{2}).

The municipality of Pincara contains the frazioni (subdivisions, mainly villages and hamlets) Bernarda, Gambaro, Paolino, Romanato, and Roncala.

Pincara borders the following municipalities: Castelguglielmo, Fiesso Umbertiano, Frassinelle Polesine, Fratta Polesine, San Bellino, Villamarzana.

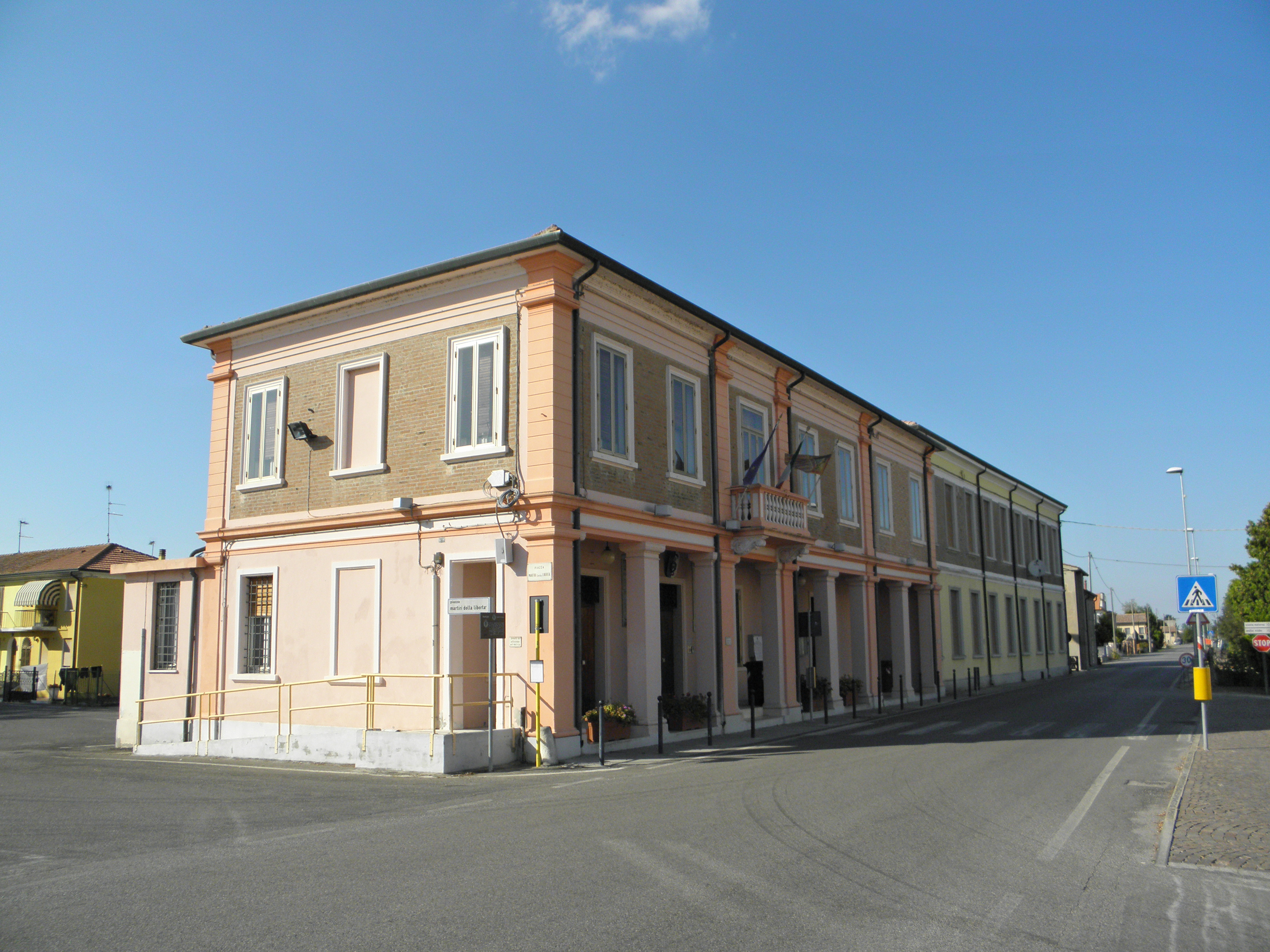
Town hall of Pincara

== Demographic evolution ==
Historical population

Year	Pop.	±%
1861	?	—
1871	1,994	—
1881	2,192	+9.9%
1901	1,912	−12.8%
1911	2,240	+17.2%

Year	Pop.	±%
1921	2,497	+11.5%
1931	2,824	+13.1%
1936	2,935	+3.9%
1951	3,121	+6.3%
1961	2,061	−34.0%

Year	Pop.	±%
1971	1,545	−25.0%
1981	1,485	−3.9%
1991	1,357	−8.6%
2001	1,277	−5.9%

Source: Data from ISTAT

== Twin towns ==
Pincara is twinned with:

- Smiltene Municipality, Latvia
