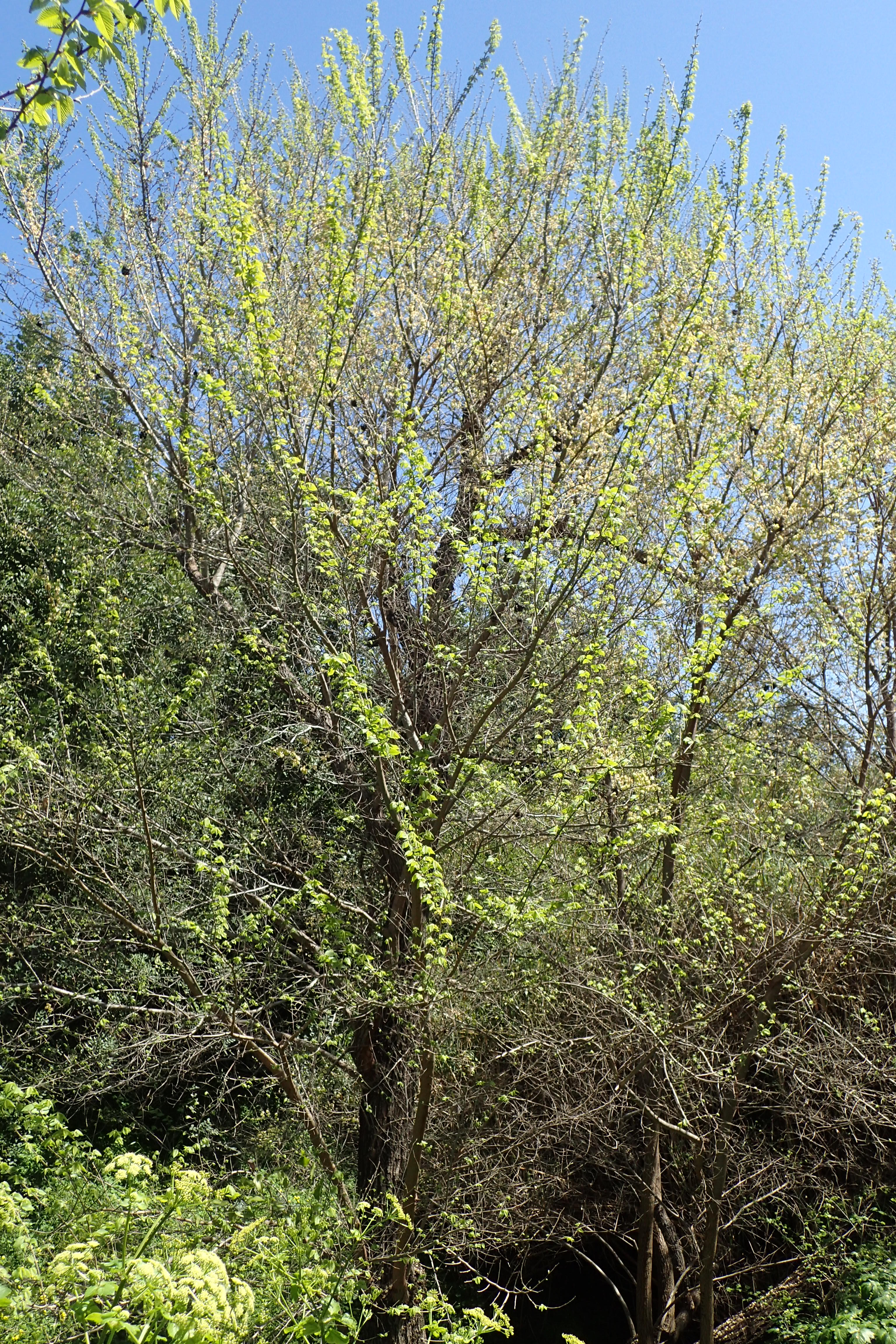
- Ulmus minor subsp. canescens in Akamas Botanical Garden, Cyprus (2017)

Scientific classification
- Kingdom: Plantae
- Clade: Embryophytes
- Clade: Tracheophytes
- Clade: Spermatophytes
- Clade: Angiosperms
- Clade: Eudicots
- Clade: Rosids
- Order: Rosales
- Family: Ulmaceae
- Genus: Ulmus
- Species: U. minor
- Subspecies: U. m. subsp. canescens

Trinomial name
- Ulmus minor subsp. canescens Bartolucci & Galasso

Synonyms
- Ulmus minor subsp. canescens (Melville) Browicz & Ziel.; Ulmus campestris var. dalmatica Bald.; Ulmus canescens Melville

= Ulmus minor subsp. canescens =

Subspecies of tree

Ulmus minor subsp. canescens is a small deciduous tree occasionally known by the common names grey elm, grey-leafed elm, and hoary elm. Its natural range extends through the lands of the central and eastern Mediterranean, from southern Italy, the islands of Sicily, Malta, Crete, Rhodes and Cyprus, and through Thrace to Turkey, and as far south as Israel, where it is now considered rare and endangered in the wild. The tree is typically found amidst the comparatively humid coastal woodlands and scrublands.

== Taxonomy ==
The taxonomy of the tree remains a matter of contention; Melville originally treated the tree as a species in its own right, U. canescens, while others, notably Richens, and Browicz & Ziel., sank it as a subspecies of Ulmus minor.

== Description ==
The tree is comparatively small, < 20 m high; the slender trunk, its bark coarsely fissured, supporting a rounded crown. The leaves are elliptic to ovate, bluntly toothed, and densely downy on the underside when mature, imbuing them with a distinctive greyish hue. The young shoots also have a whitish-grey down. The tree flowers in February and March, the round samarae, < 15 mm diameter, deeply notched at the outer end, ripen in April.

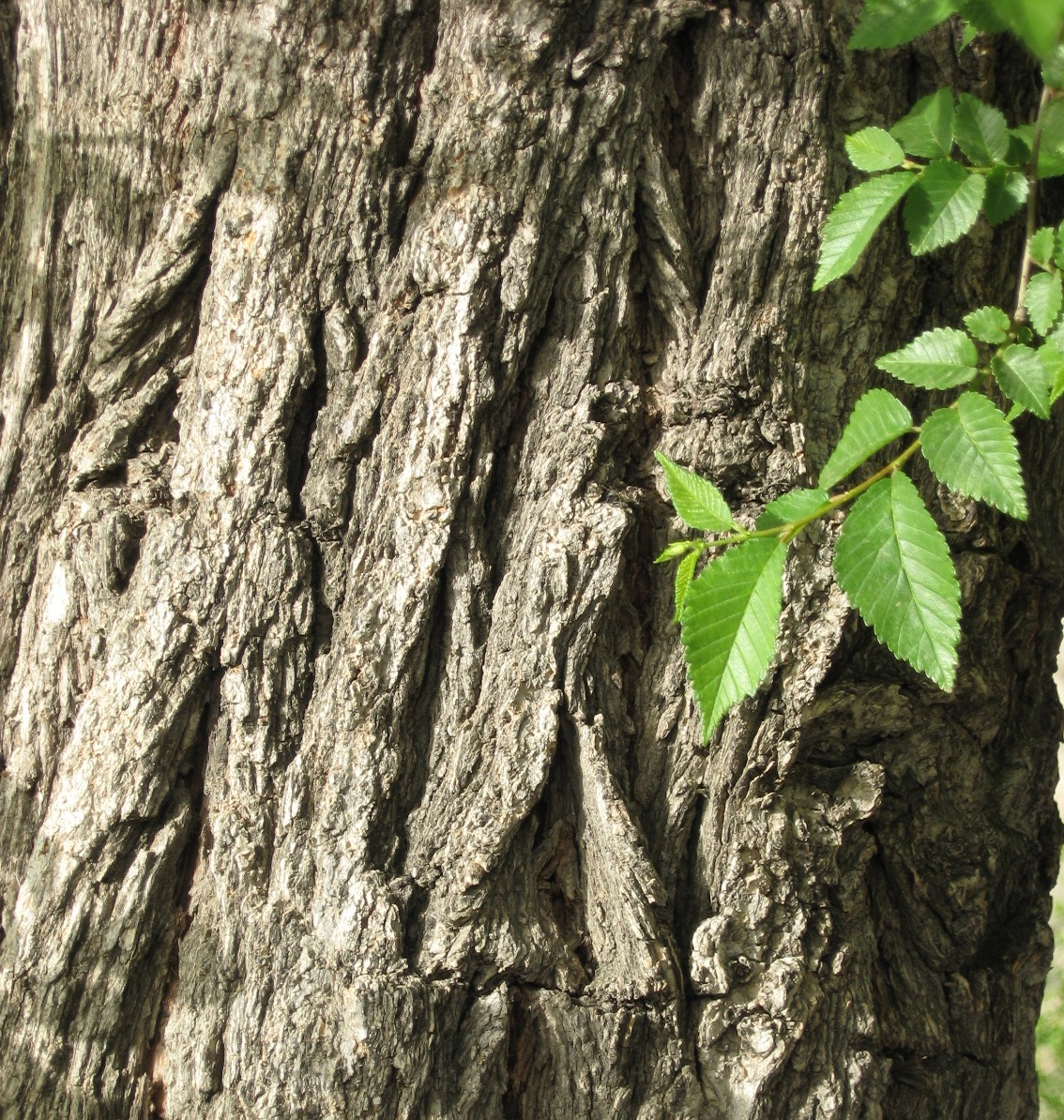
Bark and young leaves, Antal Ben Shaddad, Jerusalem

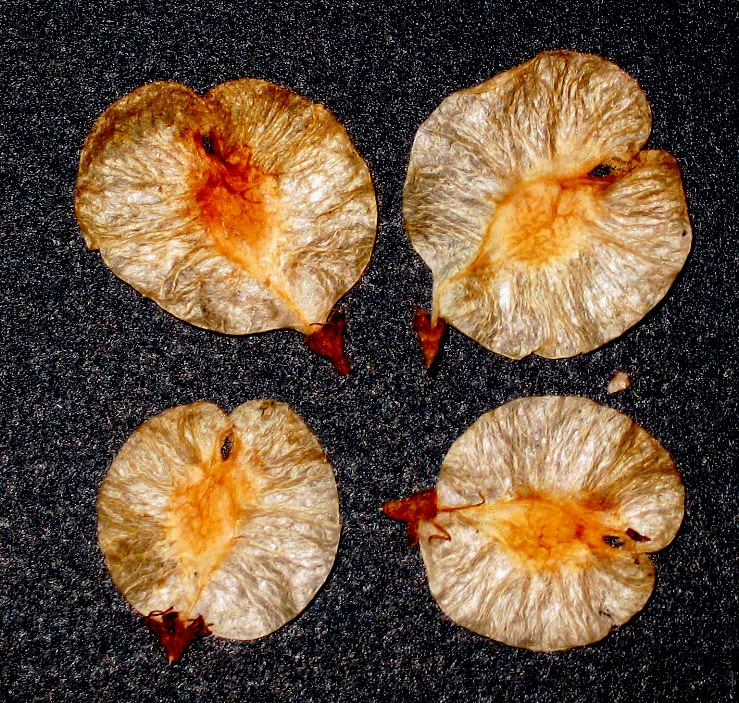
Samarae, Plain of Esdraelon, Israel

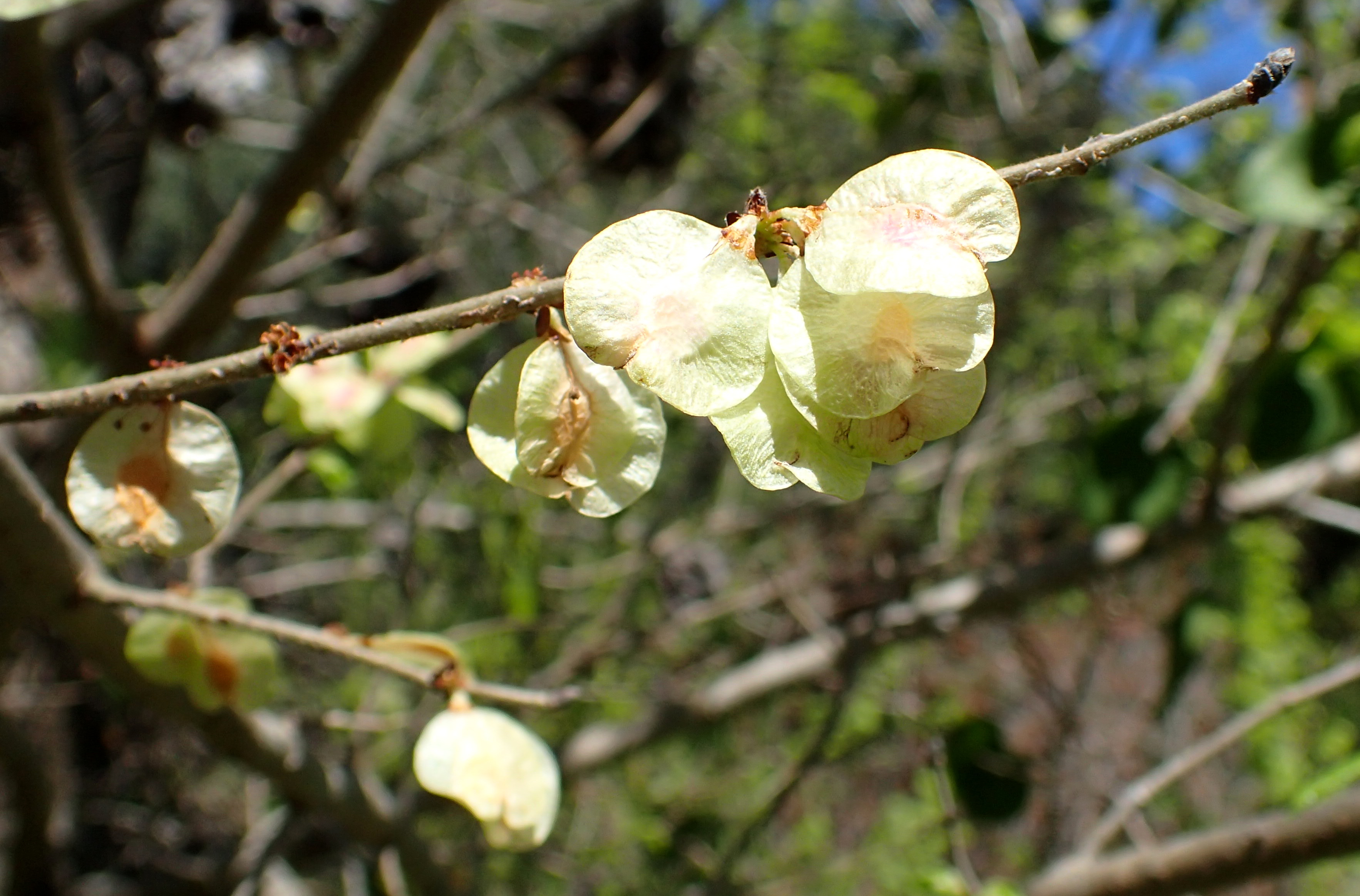
Samarae, Akamas Botanical Garden, Cyprus

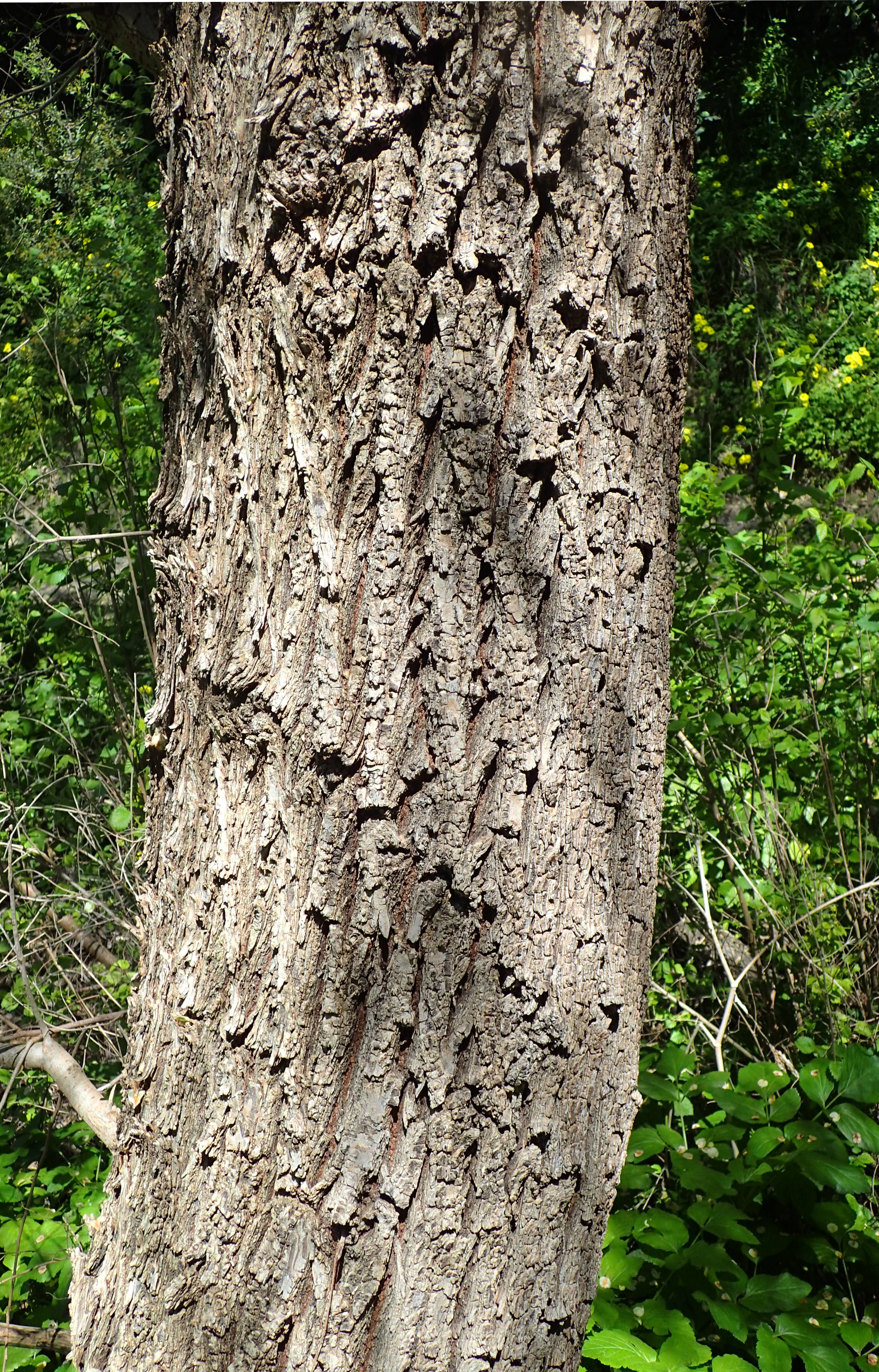
Bark, Akamas Botanical Garden, Cyprus

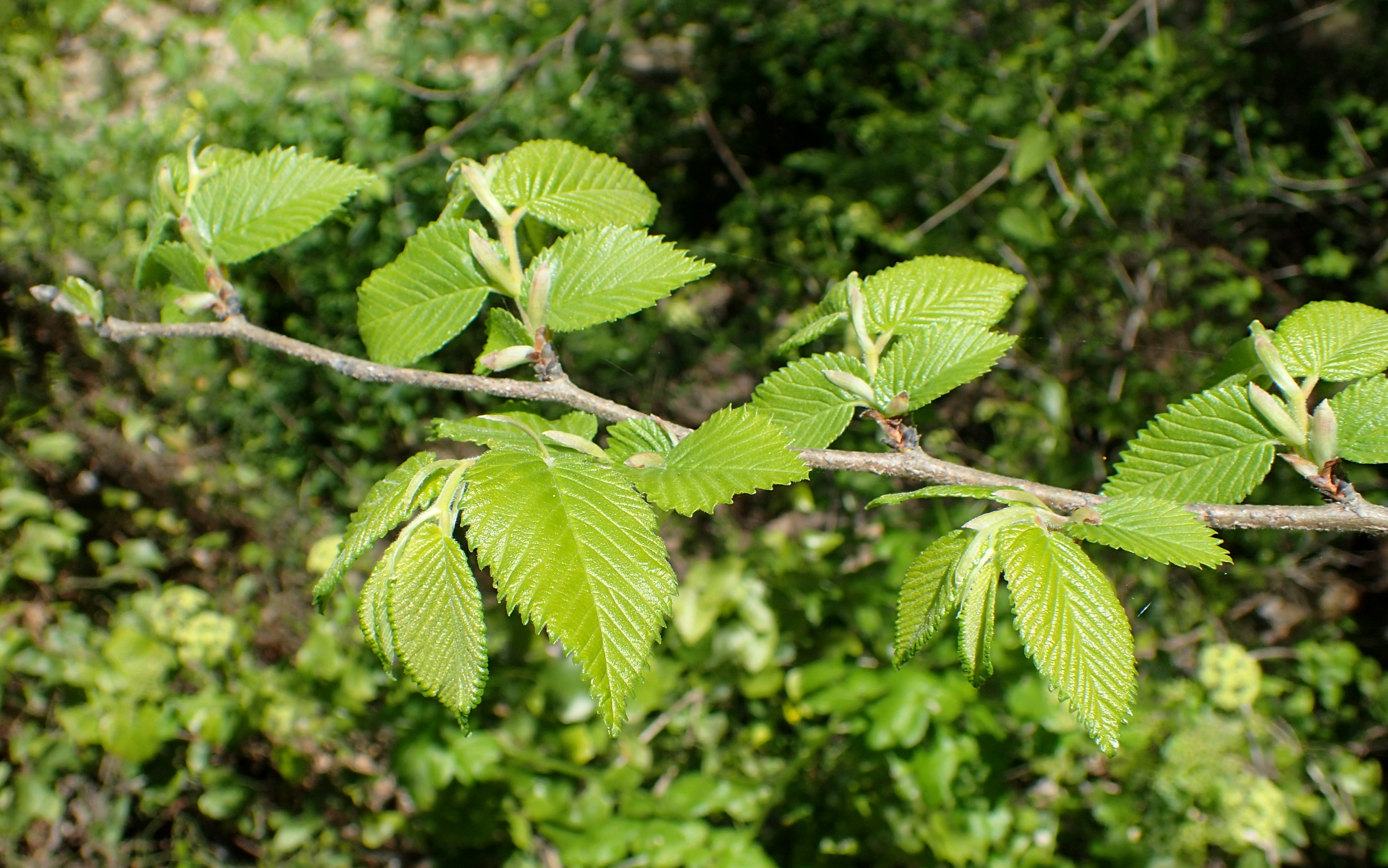
New leaves of same

== Pests and diseases ==
Ulmus minor subsp. canescens is highly susceptible to Dutch elm disease.

== Cultivation ==
Ulmus minor subsp. canescens is occasionally planted as a street tree in Israel, notably in Jerusalem near the Damascus Gate along the Prophets Road and Antal Ben Shaddad street. In Nazareth, a line of mature trees is found along the road leading to the Basilica. It is also planted in Jordan, especially Amman. There are no known cultivars of this taxon, nor is it known to be in commerce.

== Accessions ==
North America

- Morton Arboretum, US. Acc. no. 395-76

Europe

- Akamas Botanical Garden, Cyprus. Acc. details not known.
- Grange Farm Arboretum, Sutton St James, Spalding, Lincs., UK. Acc. no. 826.
- Royal Botanic Garden Edinburgh, UK. Labelled Ulmus canescens. Acc. no. 20090690. From seed wild collected in Israel. (2017).
- Sir Harold Hillier Gardens, Romsey, UK. Acc. no. 2009.0334. From seed wild collected in Israel.
