= List of municipalities of the Province of Rovigo =

The following is a list of the 50 municipalities (comuni) of the Province of Rovigo in the region of Veneto in Italy.

== List ==
Municipality	Population (2026)	Area (km²)	Density
Adria	18,878	113.39	166.5
Ariano nel Polesine	3,757	80.63	46.6
Arquà Polesine	2,578	19.93	129.4
Badia Polesine	10,378	44.53	233.1
Bagnolo di Po	1,203	21.36	56.3
Bergantino	2,340	17.97	130.2
Bosaro	1,412	6.12	230.7
Calto	699	10.85	64.4
Canaro	2,569	32.65	78.7
Canda	812	14.37	56.5
Castelguglielmo	1,510	22.13	68.2
Castelmassa	4,026	11.84	340.0
Castelnovo Bariano	2,588	37.91	68.3
Ceneselli	1,573	28.62	55.0
Ceregnano	3,377	30.17	111.9
Corbola	2,246	18.55	121.1
Costa di Rovigo	2,420	16.07	150.6
Crespino	1,787	31.86	56.1
Ficarolo	2,199	18.08	121.6
Fiesso Umbertiano	3,882	27.54	141.0
Frassinelle Polesine	1,326	21.98	60.3
Fratta Polesine	2,445	20.97	116.6
Gaiba	932	11.99	77.7
Gavello	1,418	24.37	58.2
Giacciano con Baruchella	2,083	18.42	113.1
Guarda Veneta	1,100	17.21	63.9
Lendinara	11,538	55.06	209.6
Loreo	3,177	39.84	79.7
Lusia	3,196	17.68	180.8
Melara	1,704	17.58	96.9
Occhiobello	12,022	32.33	371.9
Papozze	1,408	21.49	65.5
Pettorazza Grimani	1,392	21.45	64.9
Pincara	1,062	17.51	60.7
Polesella	3,676	16.41	224.0
Pontecchio Polesine	2,222	11.53	192.7
Porto Tolle	8,607	256.88	33.5
Porto Viro	13,675	133.77	102.2
Rosolina	6,043	74.69	80.9
Rovigo	49,994	108.81	459.5
Salara	1,027	14.16	72.5
San Bellino	1,075	15.83	67.9
San Martino di Venezze	3,806	31.05	122.6
Stienta	3,019	24.02	125.7
Taglio di Po	7,836	78.68	99.6
Trecenta	2,605	35.08	74.3
Villadose	4,640	32.07	144.7
Villamarzana	1,112	14.15	78.6
Villanova del Ghebbo	1,933	11.73	164.8
Villanova Marchesana	876	18.05	48.5

== See also ==
- List of municipalities of Veneto
- List of municipalities of Italy
