= Enrico Castellani =

Italian artist (1930–2017)

- Born: 4 August 1930; Castelmassa, Veneto
- Died: 1 December 2017 (aged 87); Celleno, Lazio
- Awards: Praemium Imperiale, 2010

Enrico Castellani (4 August 1930 – 1 December 2017) was an Italian artist. He was active in Italy from the early 1960s, and associated with Piero Manzoni and Vincenzo Agnetti. From 1959 he made monochromatic geometric reliefs using nails from a nail-gun to distort his canvases.

In 2010 he received the Praemium Imperiale for painting.

== Life ==
Castellani was born on 4 August 1930 in Castelmassa in the province of Rovigo, in the Veneto. He studied in Brussels, first sculpture and painting at the Académie Royale des Beaux-Arts, and then architecture at the École Nationale Supérieure des Arts Visuels de La Cambre. He then went to live in Milan. Castellani collaborated with artists such as Getulio Alviani, Piero Manzoni, and others.

== Death ==
He died on 1 December 2017 at his home, the Castello Orsini of Celleno, in the province of Viterbo in Lazio.
