= Ercole Sarti =

Italian painter

Ercole Sarti (23 December 1593 – ?) was an Italian painter of the Baroque period, active in Ferrara.

Also called il muto da Ficarola (the mute of Ficarolo), due to his defect (likely congenital deaf-mutism) and hometown of Ficarolo, near Rovigo. He initially trained as a pupil of Carlo Bononi. He also painted in Felonica(Quatrelle) and Salara. In Ficarolo's parish church of St. Valentine, he painted a Crucifixion with donor and Saints Valentine and Carlo Borromeo.
