= Rovigo railway station =

Railway station in Rovigo, Italy

Rovigo
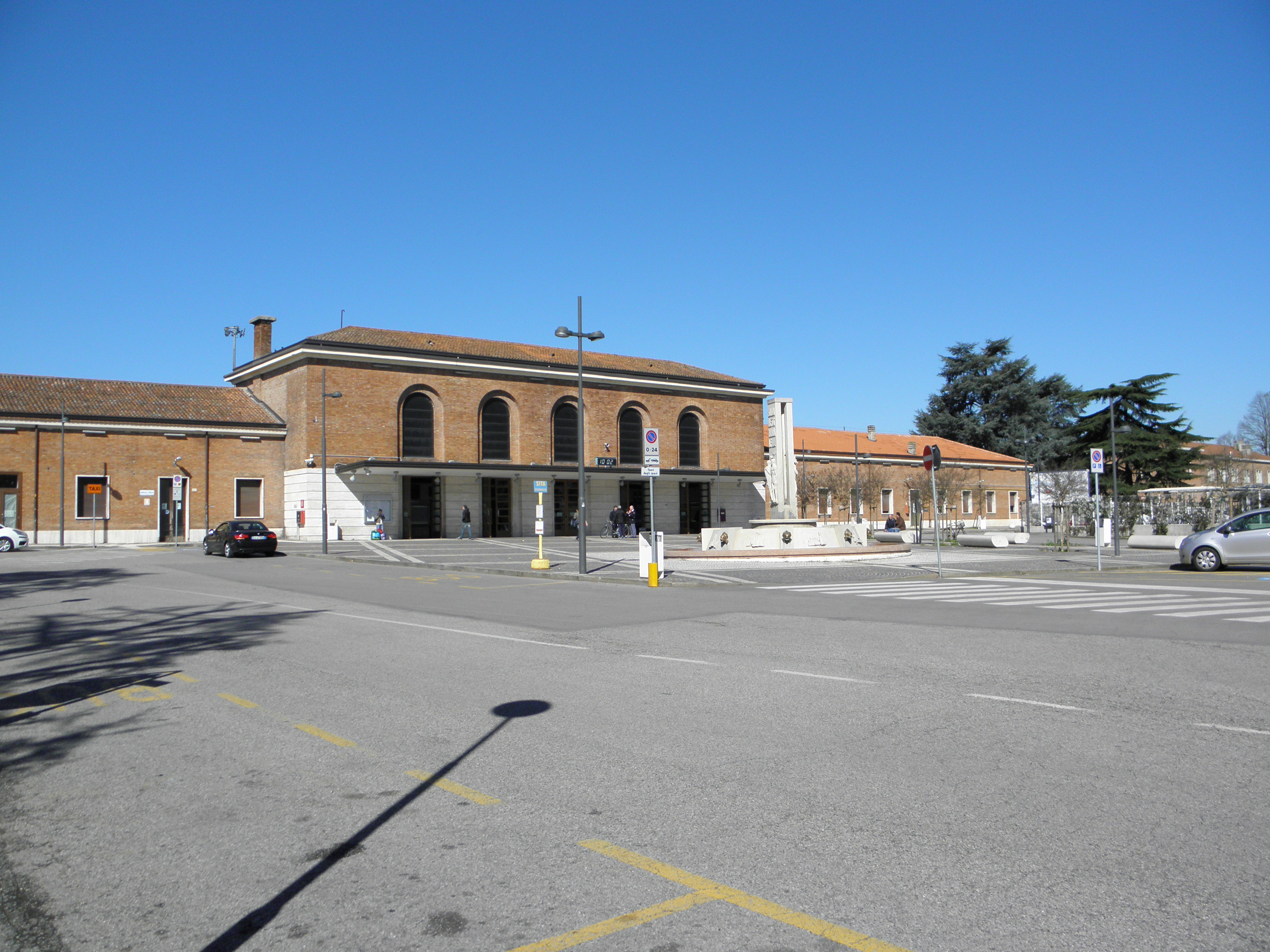
- Main entrance to the passenger building.

General information
- Location: Piazza Riconoscenza 3; 45100 Rovigo; Rovigo, Province of Rovigo, Veneto; Italy
- Coordinates: 45°04′39″N 11°46′53″E
- Owner: Rete Ferroviaria Italiana
- Operator: Centostazioni
- Lines: Padova–Bologna; Verona–Legnago–Rovigo; Rovigo–Chioggia
- Train operators: Trenitalia
- Connections: Urban and suburban buses

History
- Opened: 1866; 160 years ago
Location
- Location within Veneto Location within Northern Italy Location within Italy

Rovigo railway station (Italian: Stazione di Rovigo) serves the town and comune of Rovigo, in the Veneto region, northeastern Italy.

Opened in 1866, the station forms part of the Padua–Bologna railway, a double track electrified line. Rovigo is also a junction station for two other lines. Heading eastwards, towards Adria and Chioggia, is the Rovigo–Chioggia railway, a single track non-electrified line, and heading west, towards Legnago and Verona, is the Verona–Legnago–Rovigo railway, also single track and non-electrified.

The station is currently owned by Rete Ferroviaria Italiana (RFI). The commercial area of the passenger building is managed by Centostazioni. Main line train services to and from the station are operated by Trenitalia. Each of these companies is a subsidiary of Ferrovie dello Stato Italiane (FS), Italy's state-owned rail company.

Regional trains on the two branch lines are operated by a consortium of Trenitalia and Sistemi Territoriali, a public company controlled by the region of Veneto.

== Features ==
Rovigo railway station consists of six tracks: the first for the Rovigo-Chioggia line, the second and third for the Bologna-Padua line, the fourth and sixth for the Verona–Legnago–Rovigo line, and the fifth only for direct regional trains to Padua.

The station is also a junction of a short non-electrified single track line used by Rovigo Interporto, a goods service.

== Passenger and train movements ==
The station has about 3.6 million passenger movements each year.

Trains depart frequently from Rovigo for Venezia and Bologna, and there are numerous regional trains (R) to every part of the Veneto/Lombardy/Emilia-Romagna area, especially during peak hours. Less frequent trains also operate to other destinations.

== Interchange ==
In the piazza in front of the station, there are stops and termini of urban bus lines operated by SITA, and a taxi stand. Along the avenue leading from the station are also some suburban bus lines, again managed by SITA. These head towards the bus station, situated in the square opposite the church della Commenda, which connects to all provincial destinations plus some national coach lines.

== Gallery ==
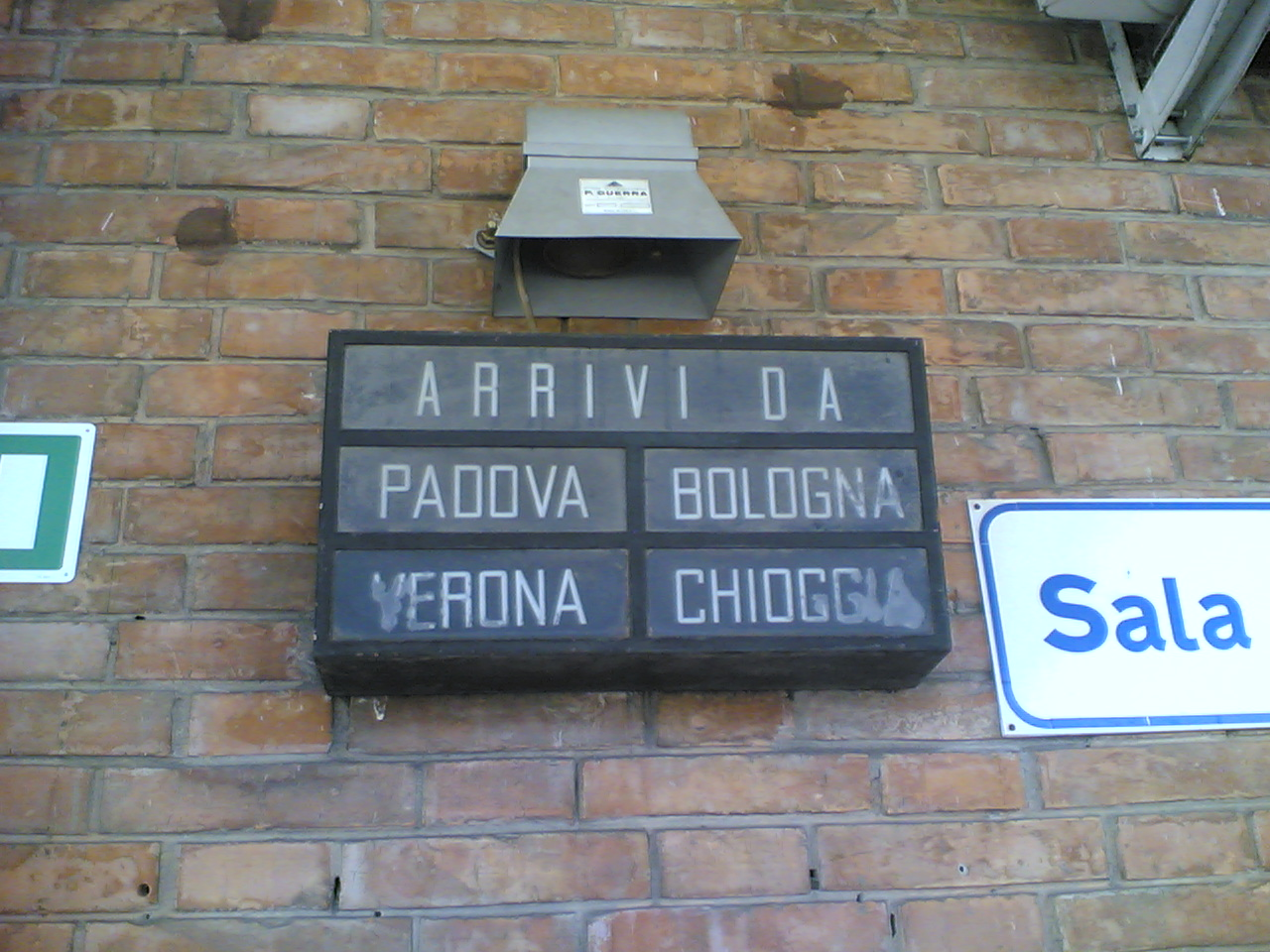
Group of visual and acoustic alarms
