= Rovigo–Chioggia railway =

The Rovigo-Chioggia railway is a state-owned Italian standard gauge railway line that connects the city of Rovigo to Chioggia. Its route runs entirely through the Veneto region and along the Po delta.

The railway is single track and standard gauge and is not electrified.

The infrastructure is managed by Rete Ferroviaria Italiana (RFI) which qualifies it as a complementary line and the passenger service is provided by Trenitalia.

== History ==
Opening history
Deals with	Inauguration
Rovigo-Adria	October 23, 1876
Adria-Loreo	September 25, 1884
Loreo-Chioggia	May 23, 1887

The railway line between Rovigo and Adria was built by the Società per le Ferrovie dell'Alta Italia (SFAI) as part of the Verona-Rovigo line, desired by the provinces of Verona and Rovigo and financed thanks to Law 29 June 1873, n. 1473. It was opened for service on 23 October 1876.

== Characteristics ==
The line is a single-track railway with 1435 mm standard gauge. Traction is thermal.
