= Castelnovo Bariano =

- Comune
- Comune di Castelnovo Bariano
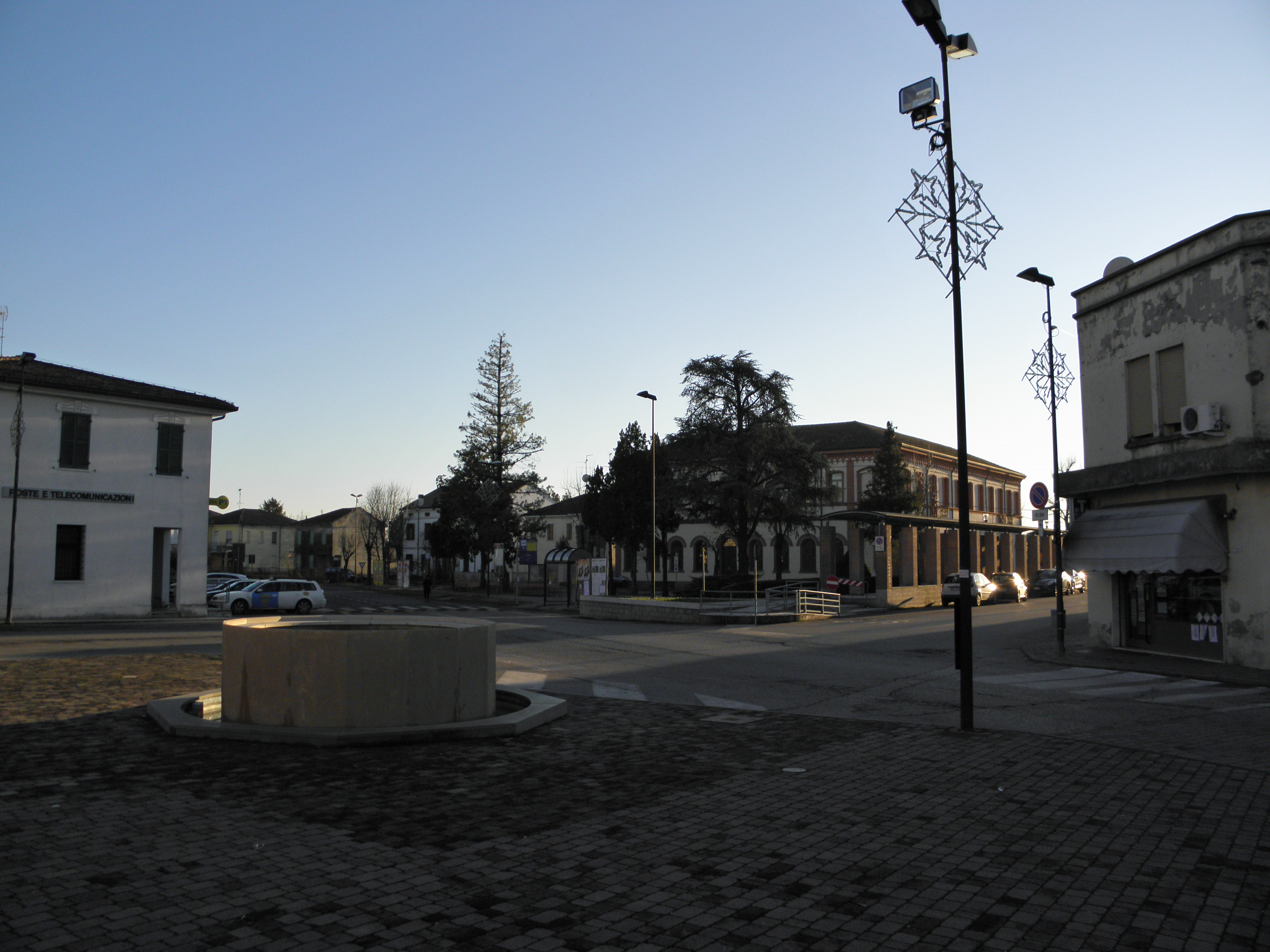

- Coat of arms

- Location within Italy Location within Veneto
- Coordinates: 45°2′N 11°17′E
- Country: Italy
- Region: Veneto
- Province: Rovigo (RO)
- Frazioni: San Pietro Polesine, Torricelle, Torretta

Government
  - Mayor: Massimo Biancardi

Area
  - Total: 37.91 km^{2} (14.64 sq mi)
- Elevation: 12 m (39 ft)

Population (30 June 2017)
  - Total: 2,722
  - Density: 71.80/km^{2} (186.0/sq mi)
- Time zone: UTC+1 (CET)
  - Summer (DST): UTC+2 (CEST)
- Postal code: 45030
- Dialing code: 0425
- Patron saint: St. Anthony
- Saint day: 13 June
- Website: www.comune.castelnovobariano.ro.it

Castelnovo Bariano is a comune (municipality) in the Province of Rovigo in the Italian region Veneto, located about 90 kilometres (56 miles) southwest of Venice and about 40 kilometres (25 miles) west of Rovigo.

Castelnovo Bariano borders the following municipalities: Bergantino, Carbonara di Po, Castelmassa, Ceneselli, Giacciano con Baruchella, Legnago, Sermide e Felonica and Villa Bartolomea.
