= Calto =

Municipality in Veneto, Italy

- Comune
- Comune di Calto
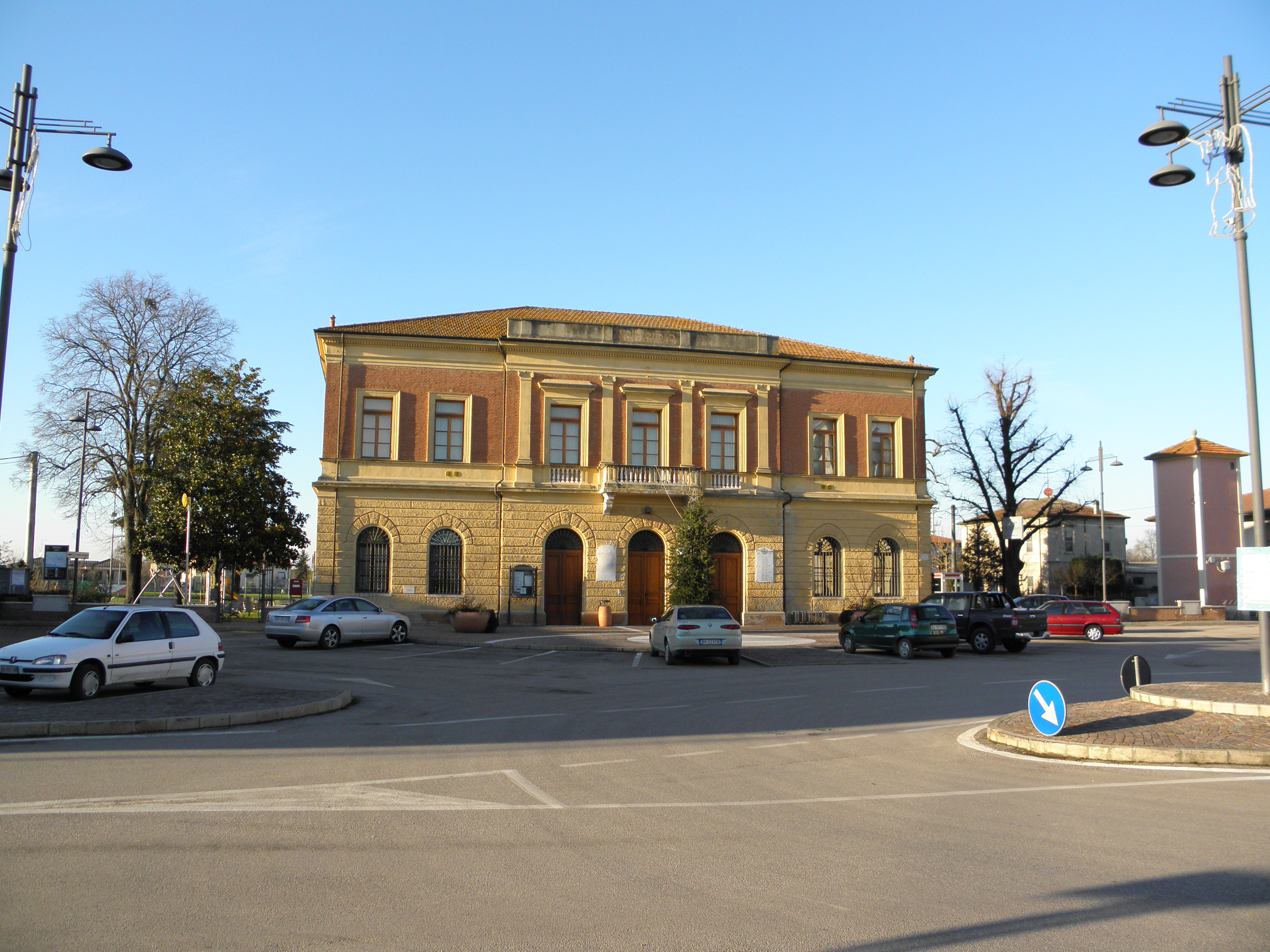
- Palazzo (palace) Riminaldi, the town hall

- Location within Italy Location within Veneto
- Coordinates: 45°0′N 11°21′E
- Country: Italy
- Region: Veneto
- Province: Rovigo (RO)

Government
  - Mayor: Michele Fioravanti

Area
  - Total: 10.85 km^{2} (4.19 sq mi)
- Elevation: 11 m (36 ft)

Population (30 April 2017)
  - Total: 730
  - Density: 67/km^{2} (170/sq mi)
- Demonym: Caltesi
- Time zone: UTC+1 (CET)
  - Summer (DST): UTC+2 (CEST)
- Postal code: 45030
- Dialing code: 0425
- Website: Official website

Calto is a municipality (Italian: comune) in the Province of Rovigo in the Italian region Veneto, located about 90 kilometres (56 mi) southwest of Venice and about 35 kilometres (22 mi) west of Rovigo.

Calto borders the following municipalities: Castelmassa, Ceneselli, Salara, Sermide e Felonica.
