= Villadose =

Villadose Viładóxe
- Comune
- Comune di Villadose
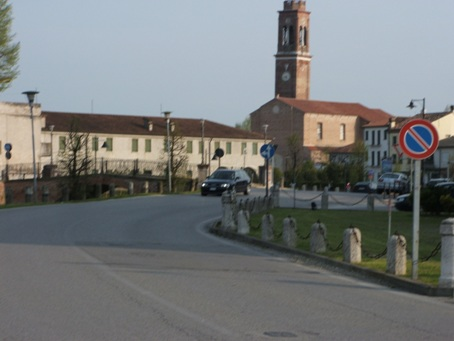
- View of the center of Villadose, with the parish church

- Location within Italy Location within Veneto
- Coordinates: 45°4′N 11°54′E
- Country: Italy
- Region: Veneto
- Province: Province of Rovigo (RO)
- Frazioni: Cambio and Canale di Villadose, (Ca' Tron is località)

Government
  - Mayor: Pierpaolo Barison (2020-)

Area
  - Total: 32.5 km^{2} (12.5 sq mi)
- Elevation: 5 m (16 ft)

Population (Dec. 2004)
  - Total: 5,303
  - Density: 163/km^{2} (423/sq mi)
- Demonym: Villadosani
- Time zone: UTC+1 (CET)
  - Summer (DST): UTC+2 (CEST)
- Postal code: 45010
- Dialing code: 0425
- Patron saint: Leonardo (Nov. 6th)
- Website: Official website

Villadose (Venetian: Viładóxe) is a comune (municipality) in the Province of Rovigo in the Italian region Veneto, located about 50 kilometres (31 mi) southwest of Venice and about 8 kilometres (5 mi) east of Rovigo. As of 31 December 2004, it had a population of 5,303 and an area of 32.5 square kilometres (12.5 mi^{2}).

The municipality of Villadose contains the località (villages and hamlets) Cambio, Canale di Villadose, and Ca' Tron.

Villadose borders the following municipalities: Adria, Ceregnano, Rovigo, San Martino di Venezze.

== Demographic evolution ==
Historical population

Year	Pop.	±%
1861	?	—
1871	3,377	—
1881	3,710	+9.9%
1901	3,856	+3.9%
1911	4,211	+9.2%

Year	Pop.	±%
1921	4,841	+15.0%
1931	5,469	+13.0%
1936	5,923	+8.3%
1951	6,504	+9.8%
1961	5,200	−20.0%

Year	Pop.	±%
1971	4,916	−5.5%
1981	5,094	+3.6%
1991	5,269	+3.4%
2001	5,248	−0.4%

Source: Data from ISTAT
