= Villanova del Ghebbo =

- Comune
- Comune di Villanova del Ghebbo
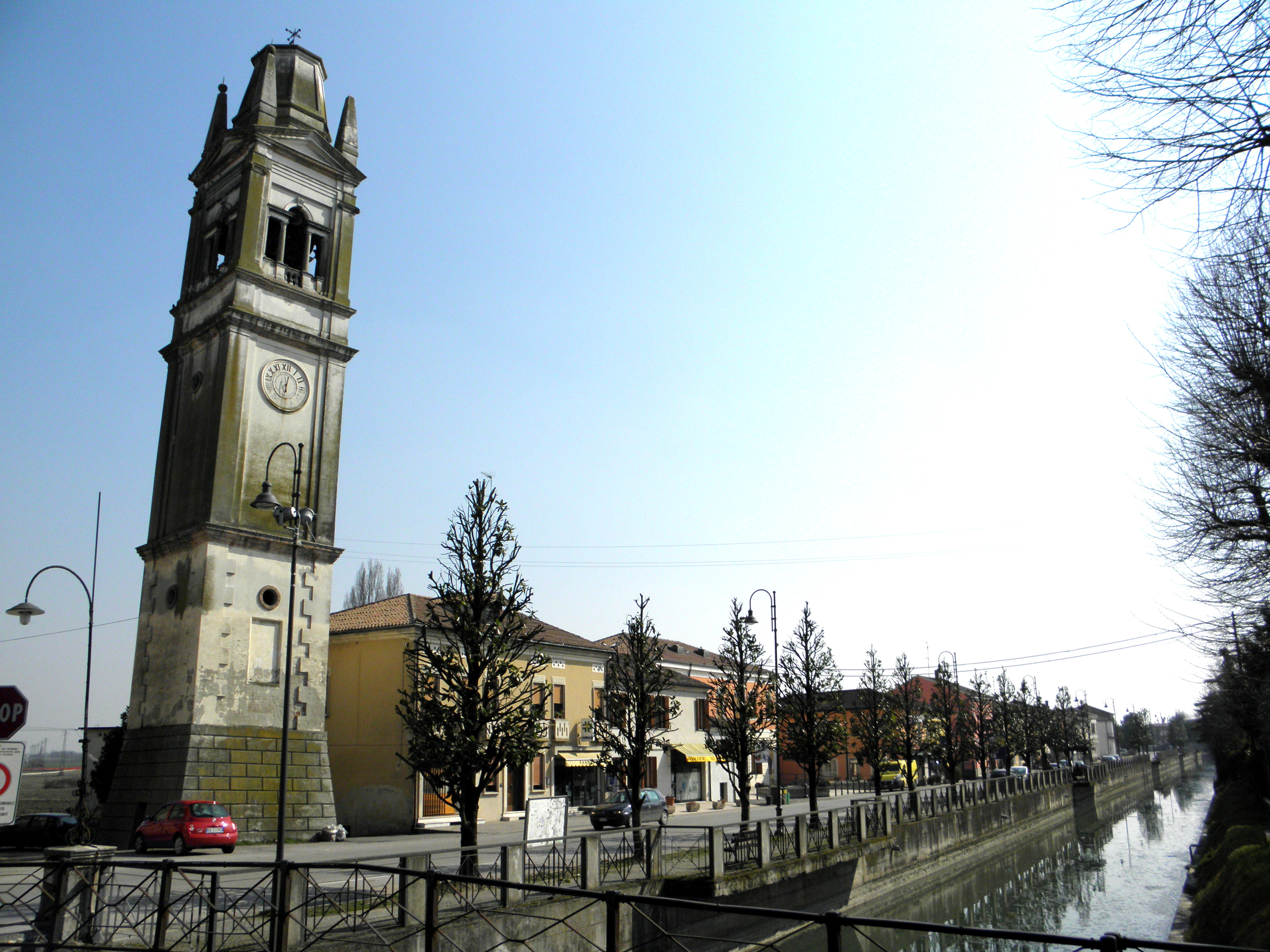

- Location within Italy Location within Veneto
- Coordinates: 45°4′N 11°39′E
- Country: Italy
- Region: Veneto
- Province: Province of Rovigo (RO)
- Frazioni: Bornio, Canton

Area
  - Total: 11.8 km^{2} (4.6 sq mi)

Population (Dec. 2004)
  - Total: 2,209
  - Density: 187/km^{2} (485/sq mi)
- Time zone: UTC+1 (CET)
  - Summer (DST): UTC+2 (CEST)
- Postal code: 45020
- Dialing code: 0425

Villanova del Ghebbo is a comune (municipality) in the Province of Rovigo in the Italian region Veneto, located about 70 kilometres (43 mi) southwest of Venice and about 10 kilometres (6 mi) west of Rovigo. As of 31 December 2004, it had a population of 2,209 and an area of 11.8 square kilometres (4.6 mi^{2}).

The municipality of Villanova del Ghebbo contains the frazioni (subdivisions, mainly villages and hamlets) Bornio and Canton.

Villanova del Ghebbo borders the following municipalities: Costa di Rovigo, Fratta Polesine, Lendinara, Lusia, Rovigo.

== Demographic evolution ==
Historical population

Year	Pop.	±%
1861	?	—
1871	1,656	—
1881	1,759	+6.2%
1901	1,793	+1.9%
1911	2,168	+20.9%

Year	Pop.	±%
1921	2,402	+10.8%
1931	2,734	+13.8%
1936	2,855	+4.4%
1951	2,893	+1.3%
1961	2,160	−25.3%

Year	Pop.	±%
1971	2,052	−5.0%
1981	2,141	+4.3%
1991	2,245	+4.9%
2001	2,196	−2.2%

Source: Data from ISTAT
