= Ceregnano =

Ceregnano Zernian
- Comune
- Comune di Ceregnano
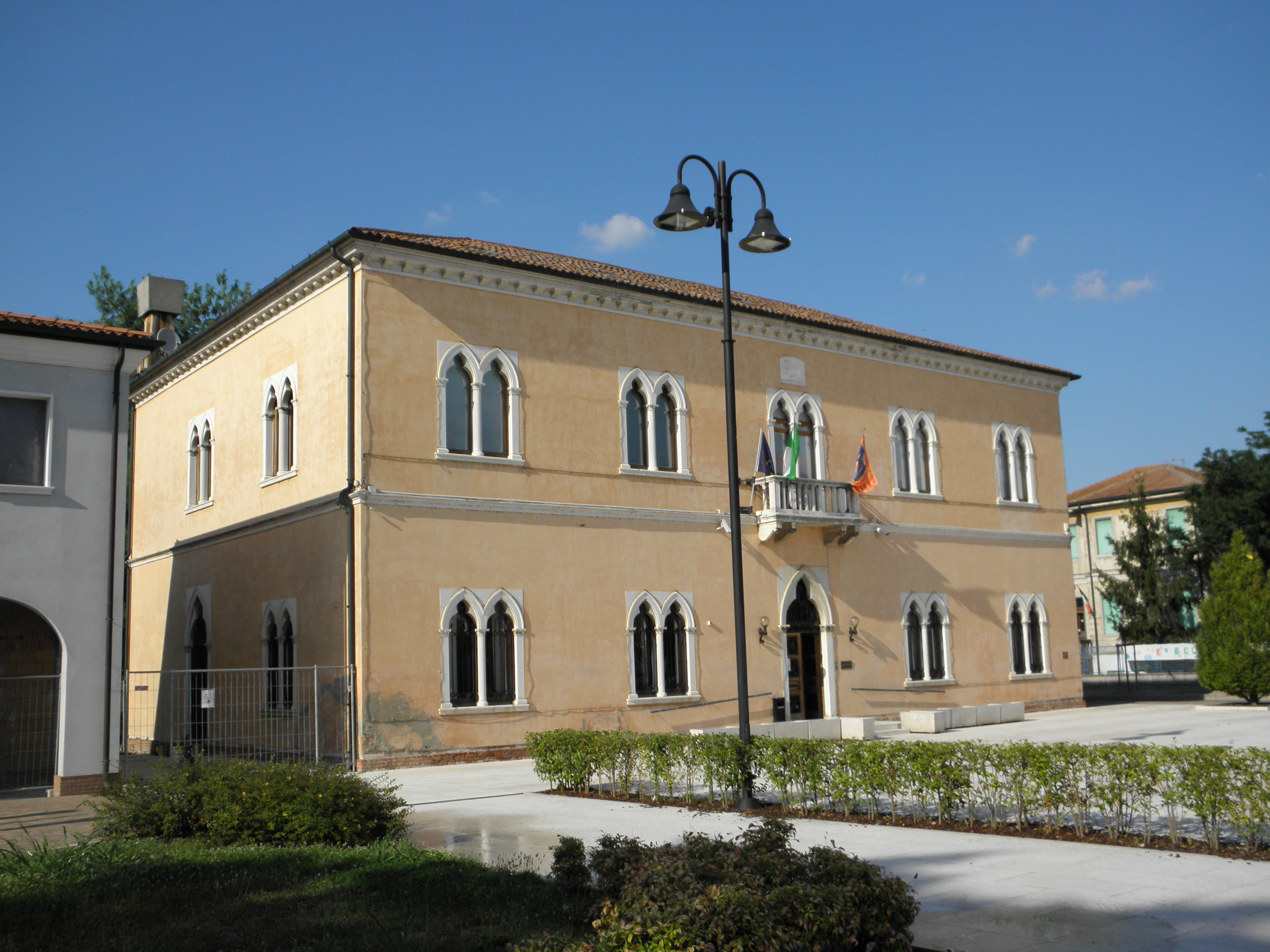
- The Town Hall

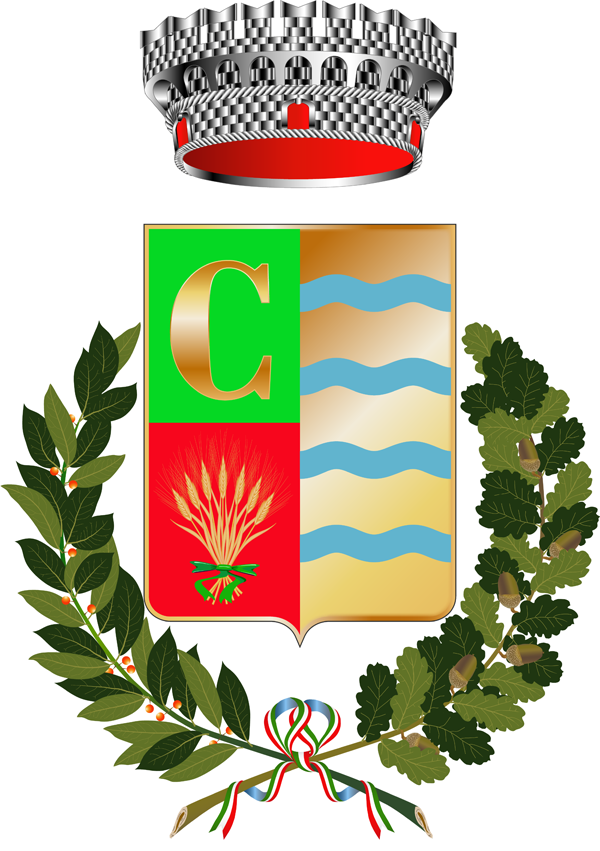
- Coat of arms

- Location within Italy Location within Veneto
- Coordinates: 45°2′N 11°52′E
- Country: Italy
- Region: Veneto
- Province: Rovigo (RO)
- Frazioni: Aserile, Borgo Costato, Buso-Braga, Canale, Lama Polesine, Pezzoli, Palà

Government
  - Mayor: Nadia Lucia Ferrarese

Area
  - Total: 30.0 km^{2} (11.6 sq mi)

Population (Dec. 2004)
  - Total: 3,951
  - Density: 132/km^{2} (341/sq mi)
- Time zone: UTC+1 (CET)
  - Summer (DST): UTC+2 (CEST)
- Postal code: 45010
- Dialing code: 0425
- Website: Official website

Ceregnano (Venetian: Zernian) is a comune (municipality) in the Province of Rovigo in the Italian region Veneto, located about 60 kilometres (37 mi) southwest of Venice and about 8 kilometres (5 mi) southeast of Rovigo. As of 31 December 2004, it had a population of 3,951 and an area of 30.0 square kilometres (11.6 mi^{2}).

Ceregnano borders the following municipalities: Adria, Crespino, Gavello, Rovigo, Villadose.

== Demographic evolution ==
Historical population

Year	Pop.	±%
1861	?	—
1871	3,792	—
1881	3,976	+4.9%
1901	3,743	−5.9%
1911	4,384	+17.1%

Year	Pop.	±%
1921	4,845	+10.5%
1931	5,591	+15.4%
1936	6,017	+7.6%
1951	6,461	+7.4%
1961	4,730	−26.8%

Year	Pop.	±%
1971	4,133	−12.6%
1981	4,142	+0.2%
1991	4,085	−1.4%
2001	3,942	−3.5%

Source: Data from ISTAT

== Twin towns ==
- Seeheim-Jugenheim, Germany, since 2008
