= Costa di Rovigo =

- Comune
- Comune di Costa di Rovigo
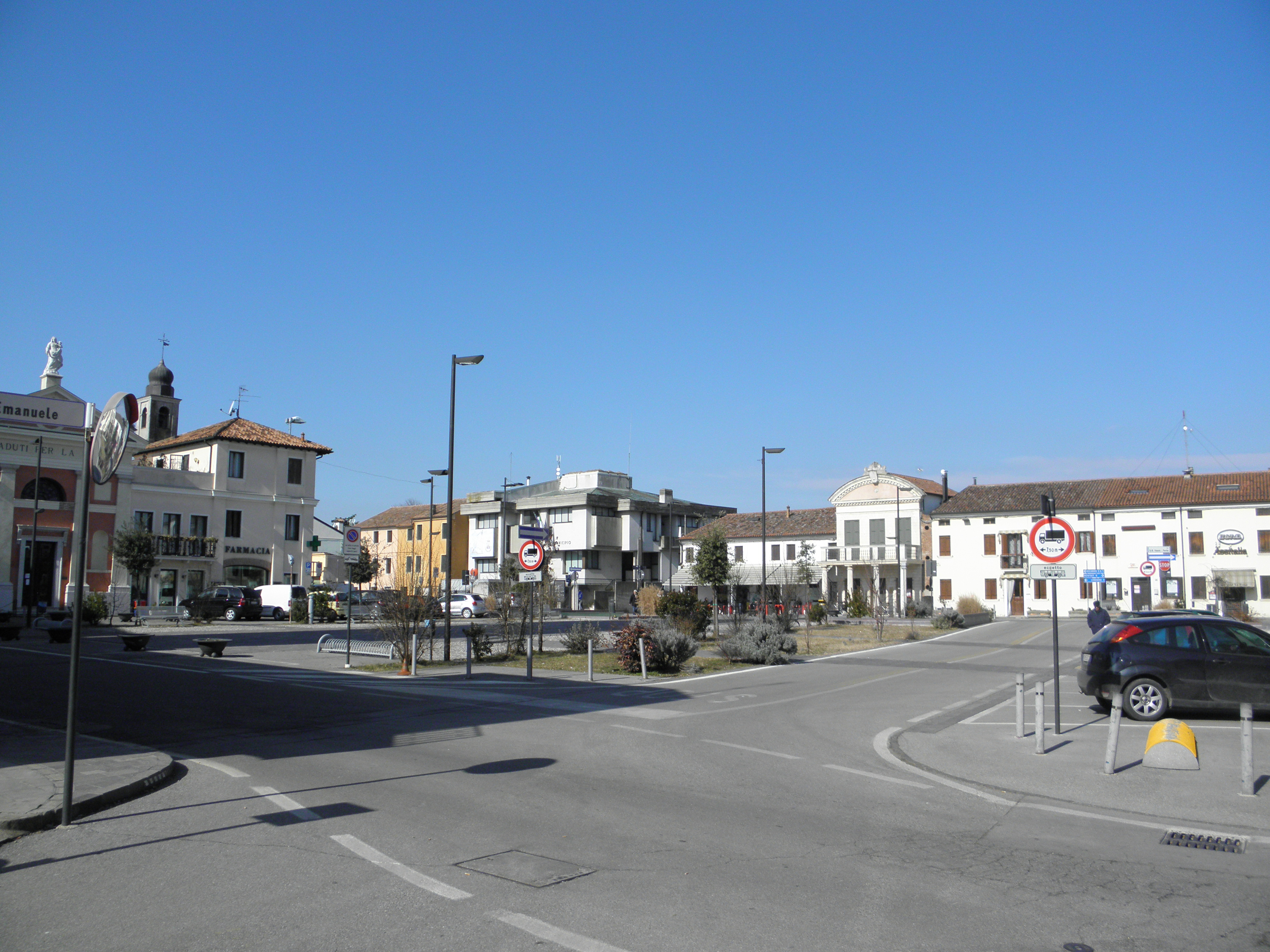
- Piazza San Rocco (Saint Roch square), the central square of Costa di Rovigo

- Location within Italy Location within Veneto
- Coordinates: 45°3′N 11°42′E
- Country: Italy
- Region: Veneto
- Province: Rovigo (RO)
- Frazioni: Case Bertante, Colomban, Stanga

Government
  - Mayor: Gian Pietro Rizzatello

Area
  - Total: 16.07 km^{2} (6.20 sq mi)
- Elevation: 8 m (26 ft)

Population (30 June 2017)
  - Total: 2,575
  - Density: 160.2/km^{2} (415.0/sq mi)
- Demonym: Costensi
- Time zone: UTC+1 (CET)
  - Summer (DST): UTC+2 (CEST)
- Postal code: 45023
- Dialing code: 0425
- Website: Official website

Costa di Rovigo is a comune (municipality) in the Province of Rovigo in the Italian region Veneto, located about 60 kilometres (37 mi) southwest of Venice and about 7 kilometres (4 mi) southwest of Rovigo.

Costa di Rovigo borders the following municipalities: Arquà Polesine, Fratta Polesine, Rovigo, Villamarzana, Villanova del Ghebbo.
