= Gavello =

- Comune
- Comune di Gavello
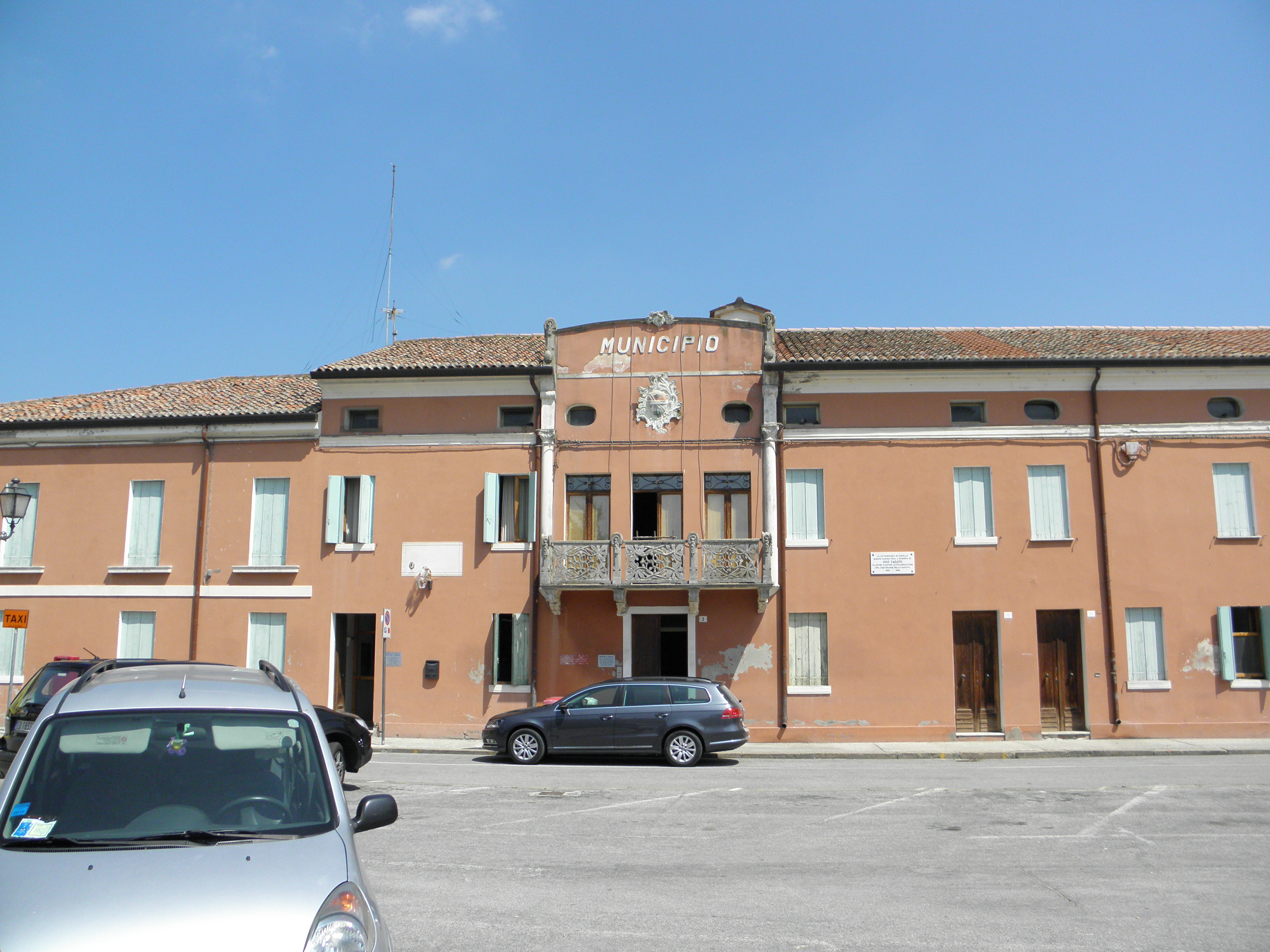
- Grimani Palace, now the town hall.

- Location within Italy Location within Veneto
- Coordinates: 45°1′N 11°55′E
- Country: Italy
- Region: Veneto
- Province: Province of Rovigo (RO)
- Frazioni: Chiavica Pignatta, Magnolina, Veneziano

Government
  - Mayor: Ampelio Spadon (since June 14, 2006)

Area
  - Total: 24.4 km^{2} (9.4 sq mi)

Population (31 December 2004)
  - Total: 1,616
  - Density: 66.2/km^{2} (172/sq mi)
- Time zone: UTC+1 (CET)
  - Summer (DST): UTC+2 (CEST)
- Postal code: 45010
- Dialing code: 0425

Gavello is a comune (municipality) in the Province of Rovigo in the Italian region Veneto, located about 60 kilometres (37 mi) southwest of Venice and about 12 kilometres (7 mi) southeast of Rovigo. As of 31 December 2004, it had a population of 1,616 and an area of 24.4 square kilometres (9.4 mi^{2}).

The municipality of Gavello contains the frazioni (subdivisions, mainly villages and hamlets) Chiavica Pignatta, Magnolina, and Veneziano.

Gavello borders the following municipalities: Adria, Ceregnano, Crespino, Villanova Marchesana.

== Demographic evolution ==
Historical population

Year	Pop.	±%
1861	?	—
1871	2,368	—
1881	2,608	+10.1%
1901	2,666	+2.2%
1911	3,071	+15.2%

Year	Pop.	±%
1921	3,491	+13.7%
1931	3,845	+10.1%
1936	3,943	+2.5%
1951	4,148	+5.2%
1961	2,671	−35.6%

Year	Pop.	±%
1971	2,021	−24.3%
1981	1,856	−8.2%
1991	1,728	−6.9%
2001	1,641	−5.0%

Source: Data from ISTAT
