= Trecenta =

- Comune
- Comune di Trecenta
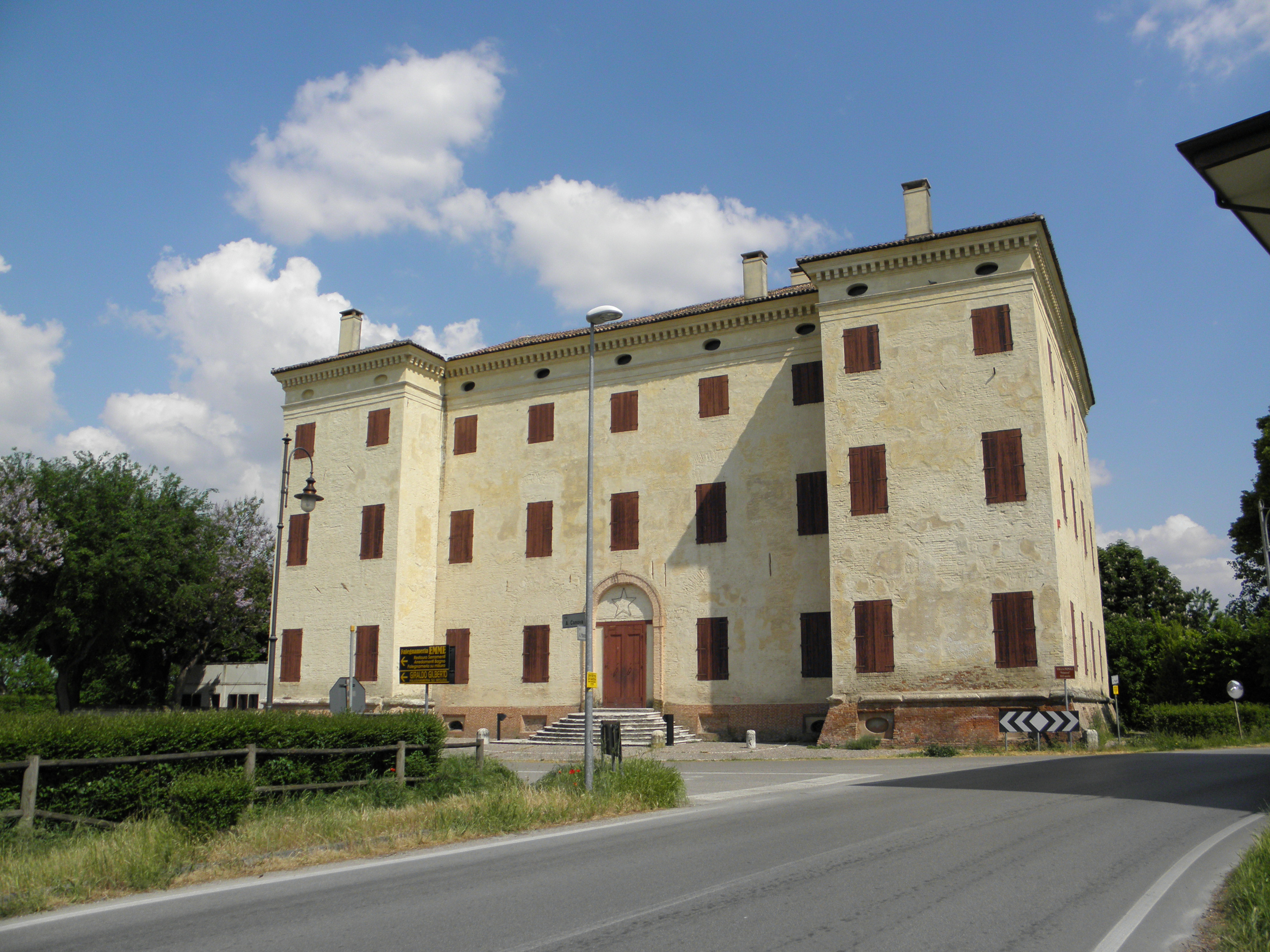
- Palazzo Pepoli.

- Coat of arms

- Location within Italy Location within Veneto
- Coordinates: 45°2′N 11°27′E
- Country: Italy
- Region: Veneto
- Province: Rovigo (RO)
- Frazioni: Pissatola, Sariano

Government
  - Mayor: Antonio Laruccia

Area
  - Total: 35.08 km^{2} (13.54 sq mi)
- Elevation: 11 m (36 ft)

Population (30 April 2022)
  - Total: 2,537
  - Density: 72.32/km^{2} (187.3/sq mi)
- Demonym: Trecentani
- Time zone: UTC+1 (CET)
  - Summer (DST): UTC+2 (CEST)
- Postal code: 45027
- Dialing code: 0425
- Website: Official website

Trecenta (Trexenta in venetian) is a comune (municipality) in the Province of Rovigo in the Italian region Veneto, located about 80 kilometres (50 mi) southwest of Venice and about 25 kilometres (16 mi) west of Rovigo.

Trecenta borders the following municipalities: Badia Polesine, Bagnolo di Po, Canda, Ceneselli, Giacciano con Baruchella, Salara.

== Twin towns ==
- Conversano, Italy
