= Ceneselli =

- Comune
- Comune di Ceneselli
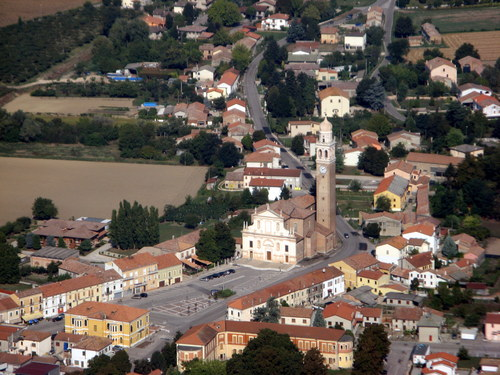

- Location within Italy Location within Veneto
- Coordinates: 45°1′N 11°22′E
- Country: Italy
- Region: Veneto
- Province: Rovigo (RO)

Government
  - Mayor: Marco Trombini

Area
  - Total: 28.62 km^{2} (11.05 sq mi)
- Elevation: 13 m (43 ft)

Population (30 June 2017)
  - Total: 1,672
  - Density: 58.42/km^{2} (151.3/sq mi)
- Demonym: Cenesellesi
- Time zone: UTC+1 (CET)
  - Summer (DST): UTC+2 (CEST)
- Postal code: 45030
- Dialing code: 0425
- Website: Official website

Ceneselli is a comune (municipality) in the Province of Rovigo in the Italian region Veneto, located about 90 kilometres (56 mi) southwest of Venice and about 35 kilometres (22 mi) west of Rovigo.

Ceneselli borders the following municipalities: Calto, Castelmassa, Castelnovo Bariano, Giacciano con Baruchella, Salara, Trecenta.
