= Lusia, Veneto =

Lusia
- Comune
- Comune di Lusia
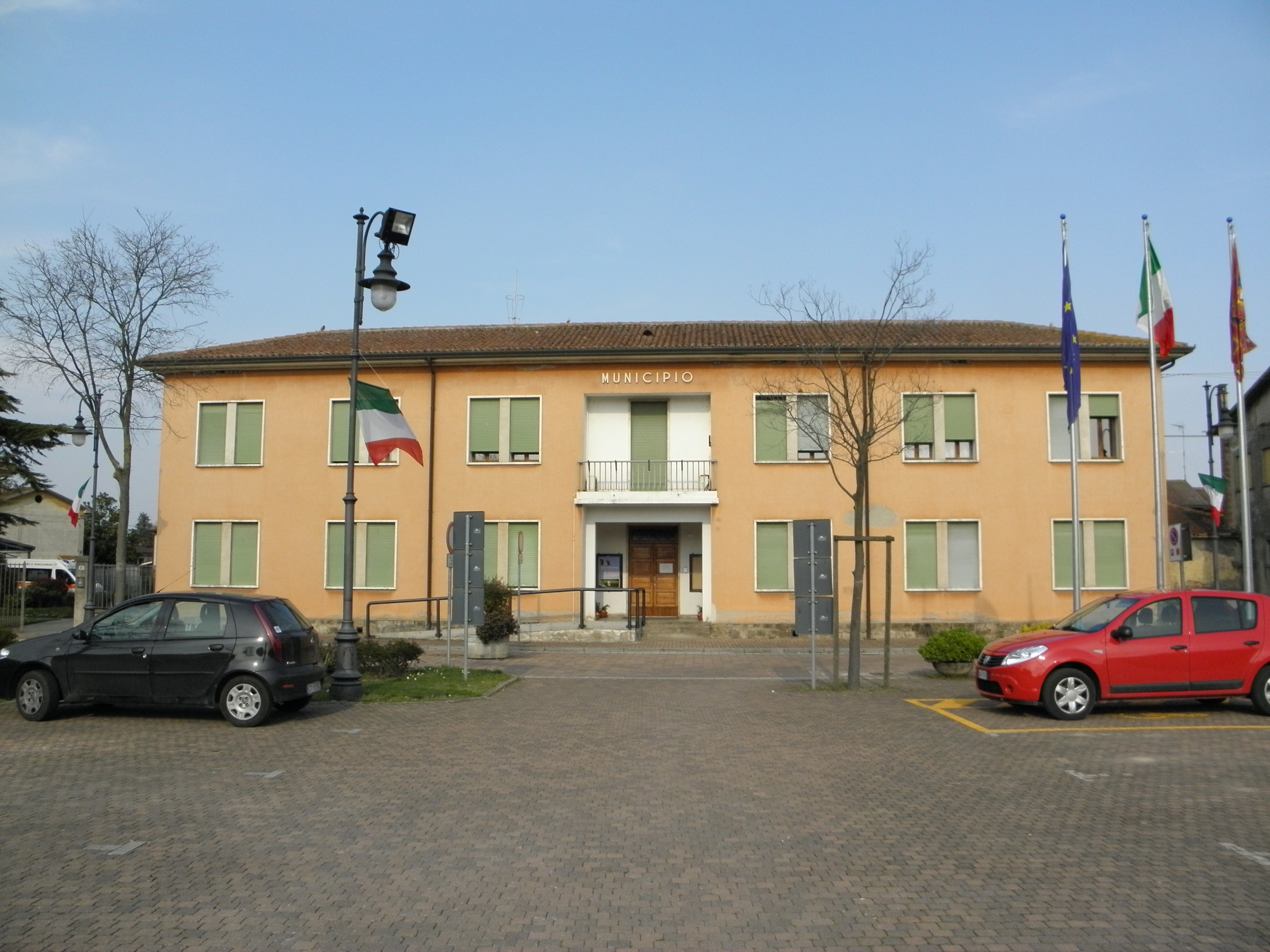
- Lusia town hall

- Location within Italy Location within Veneto
- Coordinates: 45°6′N 11°40′E
- Country: Italy
- Region: Veneto
- Province: Province of Rovigo (RO)
- Frazioni: Alberone, Arzaron, Bornio, Ca'Morosini, Cavazzana, Ceresolo-Santa Lucia, Contra' Nova, Garzare, Giare, Marasso, Pioppello, Saline

Area
  - Total: 17.7 km^{2} (6.8 sq mi)

Population (Dec. 2004)
  - Total: 3,623
  - Density: 205/km^{2} (530/sq mi)
- Demonym: Lusiani
- Time zone: UTC+1 (CET)
  - Summer (DST): UTC+2 (CEST)
- Postal code: 45020
- Dialing code: 0425

Lusia is a comune (municipality) in the Province of Rovigo in the Italian region Veneto, located about 60 kilometres (37 mi) southwest of Venice and about 10 kilometres (6 mi) northwest of Rovigo. As of 31 December 2004, it had a population of 3,623 and an area of 17.7 square kilometres (6.8 mi^{2}).

The municipality of Lusia contains the frazioni (subdivisions, mainly villages and hamlets) Alberone, Arzaron, Bornio, Ca'Morosini, Cavazzana, Ceresolo-Santa Lucia, Contra' Nova, Garzare, Giare, Marasso, Pioppello, and Saline.

Lusia borders the following municipalities: Barbona, Lendinara, Rovigo, Sant'Urbano, Villanova del Ghebbo.

== Demographic evolution ==
Historical population

Year	Pop.	±%
1861	?	—
1871	2,752	—
1881	2,834	+3.0%
1901	2,768	−2.3%
1911	3,332	+20.4%

Year	Pop.	±%
1921	3,655	+9.7%
1931	3,928	+7.5%
1936	4,356	+10.9%
1951	4,534	+4.1%
1961	3,679	−18.9%

Year	Pop.	±%
1971	3,579	−2.7%
1981	3,519	−1.7%
1991	3,584	+1.8%
2001	3,587	+0.1%

Source: Data from ISTAT
