= Canda =

- Comune
- Comune di Canda
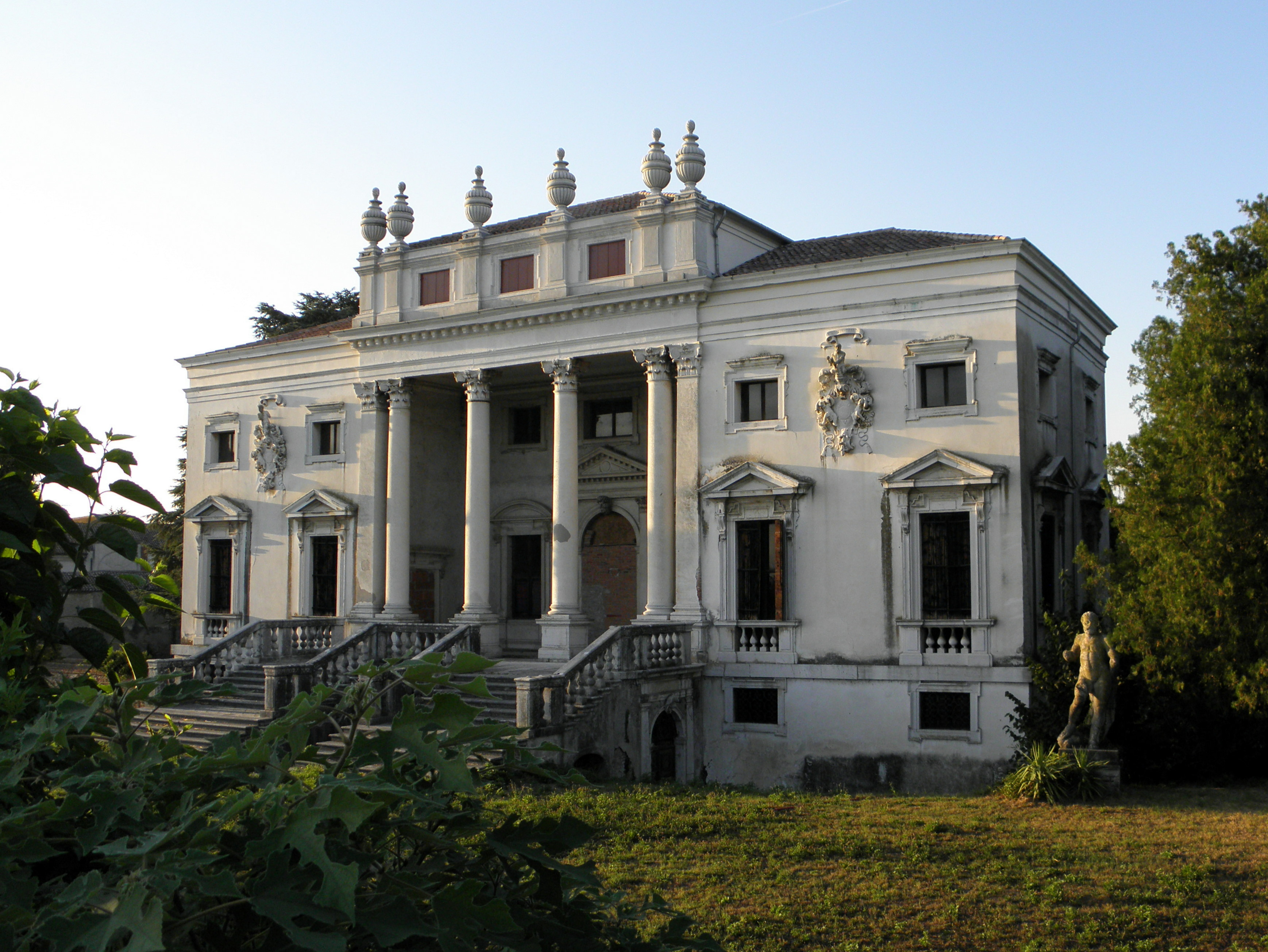
- Villa Nani Mocenigo

- Location within Italy Location within Veneto
- Coordinates: 45°2′N 11°31′E
- Country: Italy
- Region: Veneto
- Province: Province of Rovigo (RO)
- Frazioni: La Chiavica, Le Campagnole

Area
  - Total: 14.4 km^{2} (5.6 sq mi)
- Elevation: 9 m (30 ft)

Population (Apr.2017)
  - Total: 900
  - Density: 62/km^{2} (160/sq mi)
- Time zone: UTC+1 (CET)
  - Summer (DST): UTC+2 (CEST)
- Dialing code: 0425

Canda is a comune (municipality) in the Province of Rovigo in the Italian region Veneto, located about 80 km (50 mi) southwest of Venice and about 20 kilometres (12 mi) west of Rovigo. As of 31 December 2004, it had a population of 958 and an area of 14.4 square kilometres (5.6 mi^{2}).

The municipality of Canda contains the frazioni (subdivisions, mainly villages and hamlets) La Chiavica and Le Campagnole.

Canda borders the following municipalities: Badia Polesine, Bagnolo di Po, Castelguglielmo, Lendinara, Trecenta.

== Demographic evolution ==
Historical population

Year	Pop.	±%
1861	?	—
1871	1,733	—
1881	1,763	+1.7%
1901	1,750	−0.7%
1911	1,815	+3.7%

Year	Pop.	±%
1921	1,928	+6.2%
1931	1,959	+1.6%
1936	2,025	+3.4%
1951	2,161	+6.7%
1961	1,438	−33.5%

Year	Pop.	±%
1971	1,200	−16.6%
1981	1,112	−7.3%
1991	1,029	−7.5%
2001	936	−9.0%

Source: Data from ISTAT
