= Occhiobello =

Occhiobello Ug’bèl
- Comune
- Comune di Occhiobello
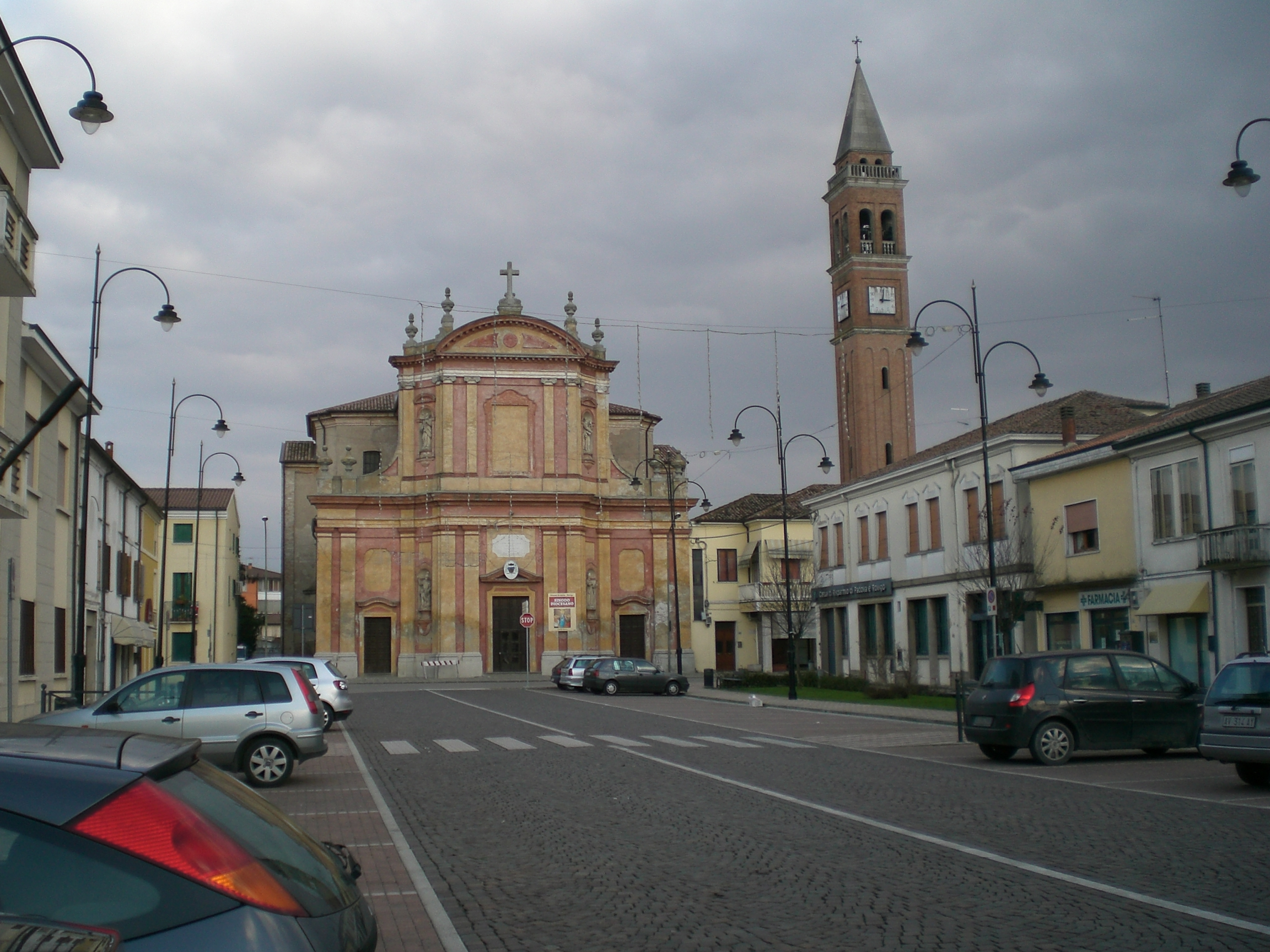

- Location within Italy Location within Veneto
- Coordinates: 44°55′N 11°35′E
- Country: Italy
- Region: Veneto
- Province: Rovigo (RO)
- Frazioni: Gurzone, Santa Maria Maddalena

Government
  - Mayor: Daniele Chiarioni

Area
  - Total: 32.62 km^{2} (12.59 sq mi)
- Elevation: 8 m (26 ft)

Population (2008)
  - Total: 11,199
  - Density: 343.3/km^{2} (889.2/sq mi)
- Demonym: Occhiobellesi
- Time zone: UTC+1 (CET)
  - Summer (DST): UTC+2 (CEST)
- Postal code: 45030
- Dialing code: 0425
- Patron saint: St. Lawrence
- Saint day: August 10
- Website: Official website

Occhiobello (English: Beautiful Eye, Ferrarese: Ug’bèl) is a comune (municipality) in the Province of Rovigo in the Italian region Veneto, located about 80 kilometres (50 mi) southwest of Venice and about 25 kilometres (16 mi) southwest of Rovigo.

== Twin towns ==
- Mennecy, France
