= San Martino di Venezze =

San Martino di Venezze San Martin de Venezze
- Comune
- Comune di San Martino di Venezze
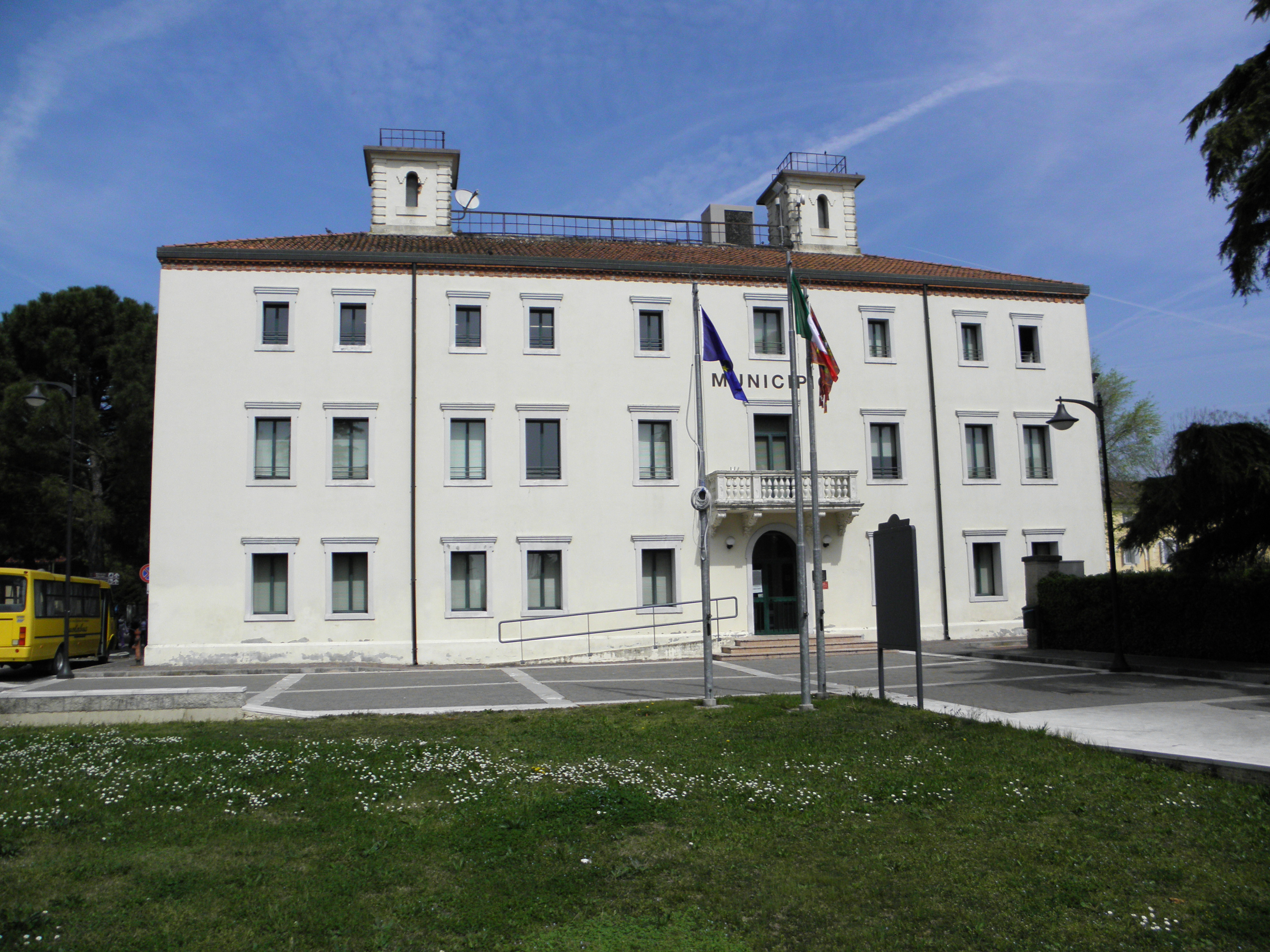
- Town Hall

- Coat of arms

- Location within Italy Location within Veneto
- Coordinates: 45°8′N 11°52′E
- Country: Italy
- Region: Veneto
- Province: Rovigo (RO)
- Frazioni: Beverare, Contea, Palazzo Corni, Trona di Sopra

Government
  - Mayor: Vinicio Piasentini

Area
  - Total: 31.1 km^{2} (12.0 sq mi)
- Elevation: 6 m (20 ft)

Population (1 March 2010)
  - Total: 4,032
  - Density: 130/km^{2} (336/sq mi)
- Time zone: UTC+1 (CET)
  - Summer (DST): UTC+2 (CEST)
- Postal code: 45030
- Dialing code: 0425

San Martino di Venezze (Venetian: San Martin de Venezze) is a comune (municipality) in the Province of Rovigo in the Italian region Veneto, located about 50 kilometres (31 mi) southwest of Venice and about 10 kilometres (6 mi) northeast of Rovigo.

San Martino di Venezze borders the following municipalities: Adria, Anguillara Veneta, Cavarzere, Pettorazza Grimani, Rovigo, Villadose.
