= Salara =

- Comune
- Comune di Salara
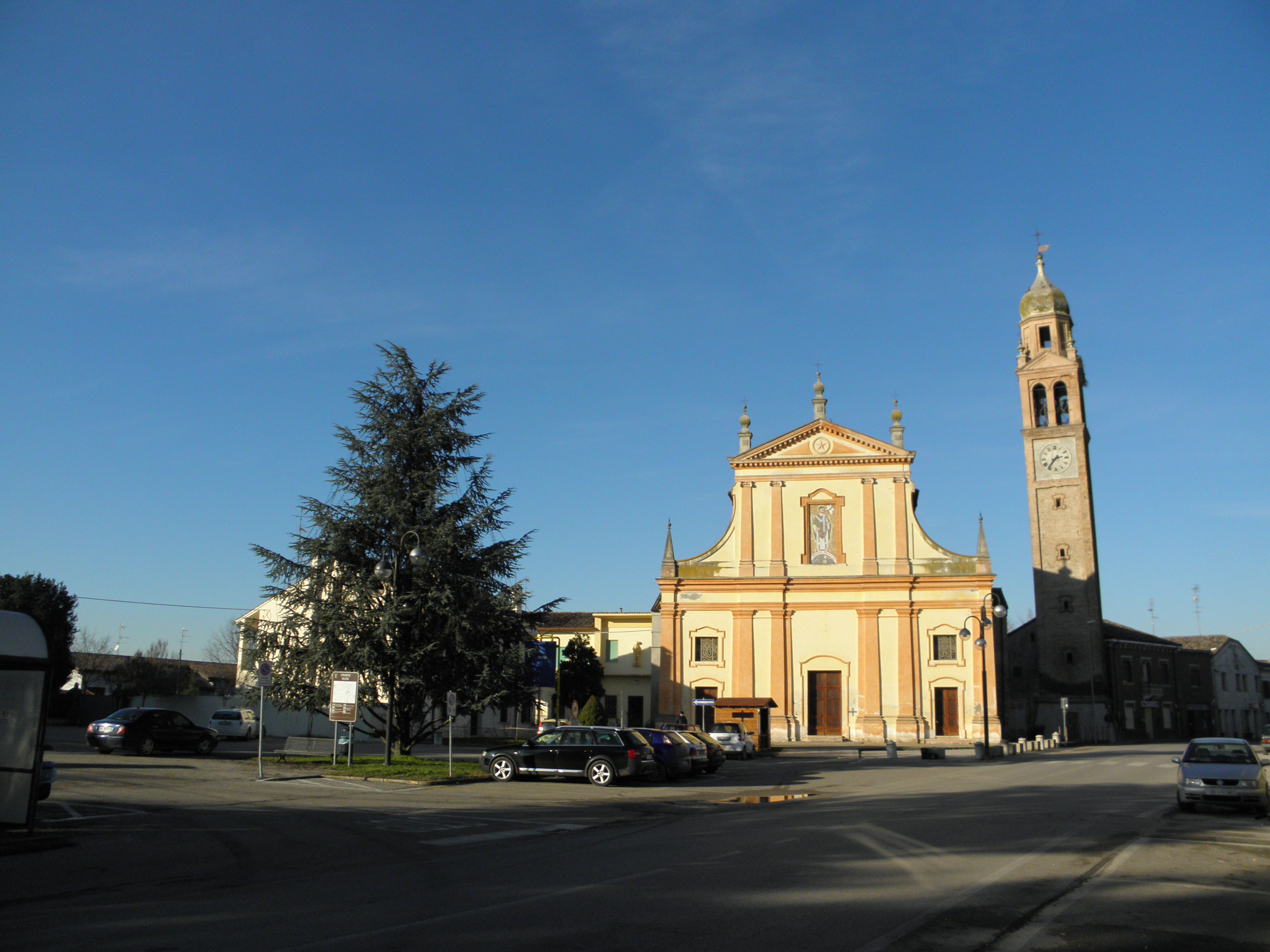
- Church of San Valentino.

- Location within Italy Location within Veneto
- Coordinates: 44°59′N 11°26′E
- Country: Italy
- Region: Veneto
- Province: Rovigo (RO)
- Frazioni: Argine Vecchio, Borgo, Caselle, Coati, Croce, Magherino, Priore, Sabbioni, Veratica

Government
  - Mayor: Andrea Prandini

Area
  - Total: 14.16 km^{2} (5.47 sq mi)
- Elevation: 7 m (23 ft)

Population (31 December 2015)
  - Total: 1,160
  - Density: 81.9/km^{2} (212/sq mi)
- Demonym: Salaresi
- Time zone: UTC+1 (CET)
  - Summer (DST): UTC+2 (CEST)
- Postal code: 45030
- Dialing code: 0425
- Website: Official website

Salara is a comune (municipality) in the Province of Rovigo in the Italian region Veneto, located about 90 kilometres (56 mi) southwest of Venice and about 30 kilometres (19 mi) southwest of Rovigo.

Salara borders the following municipalities: Bagnolo di Po, Calto, Ceneselli, Felonica, Ficarolo, Trecenta.
