= Province of Rovigo =

Province of Italy, located in the Veneto region

Coordinates: 45°4′N 11°47′E

Province of Rovigo Provincia di Rovigo (Italian)
- Province
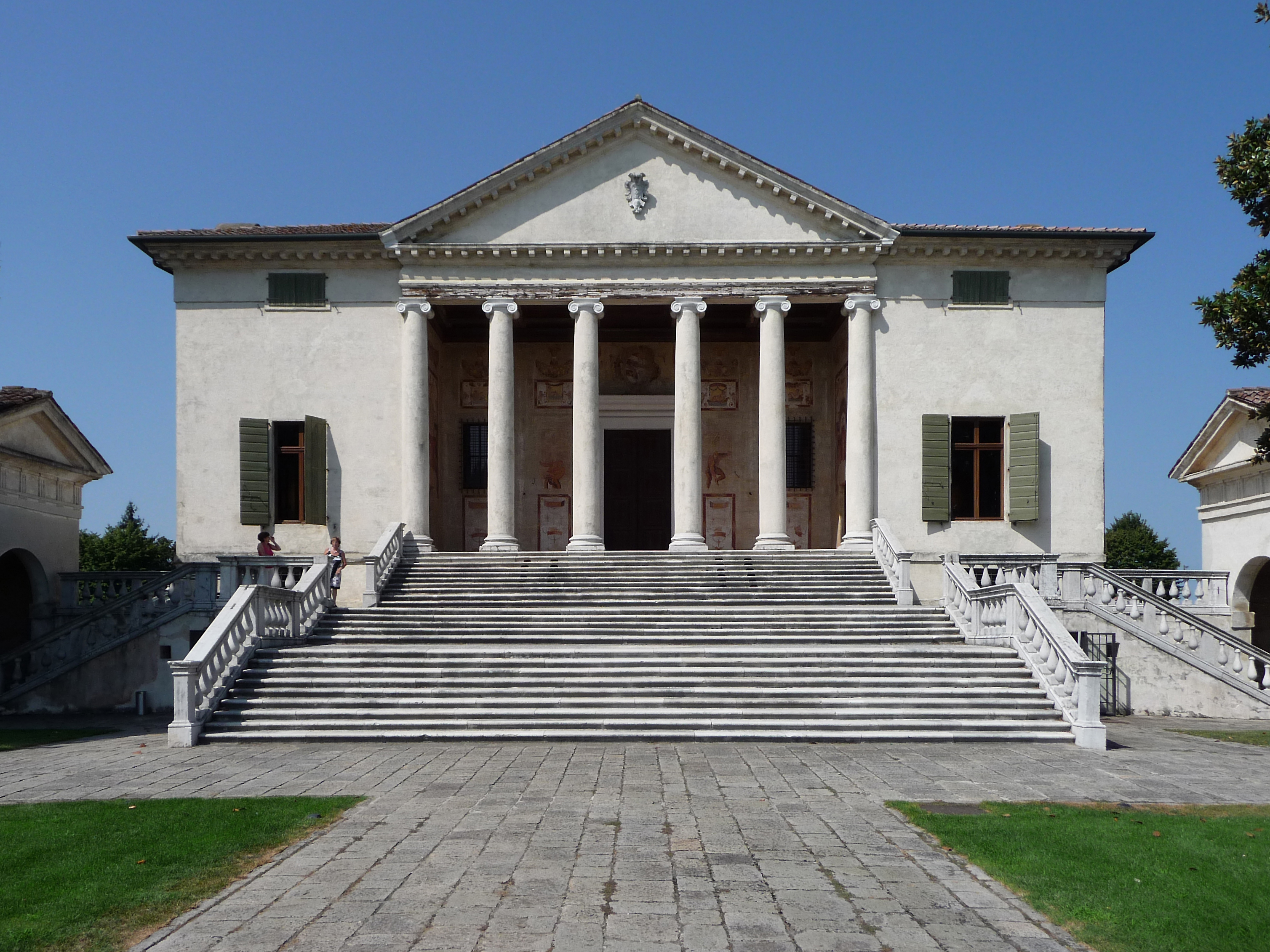
- Villa Badoer

- Flag Coat of arms

- Location of the province of Rovigo in Italy
- Country: Italy
- Region: Veneto
- Capital(s): Rovigo
- Municipalities: 50

Government
  - President: Enrico Ferrarese (Liga Veneta–Lega)

Area
  - Total: 1,819.35 km^{2} (702.45 sq mi)

Population (2026)
  - Total: 227,183
  - Density: 124.870/km^{2} (323.413/sq mi)

GDP
  - Total: €6.107 billion (2015)
  - Per capita: €25,284 (2015)
- Time zone: UTC+1 (CET)
  - Summer (DST): UTC+2 (CEST)
- Postal code: 45100, 45010-45039
- Telephone prefix: 0425, 0426
- Vehicle registration: RO
- ISTAT code: 029

The province of Rovigo (Italian: provincia di Rovigo) is a province in the Veneto region of Italy. Its capital is the city of Rovigo. It has a population of 227,183 in an area of 1,819.35 square kilometres (702.45 sq mi) across its 50 municipalities.

It borders on the north with the provinces of Verona, Padua and Venice, on the south with the province of Ferrara, on the west with the province of Mantua, and on the east with the Adriatic Sea.

== History ==
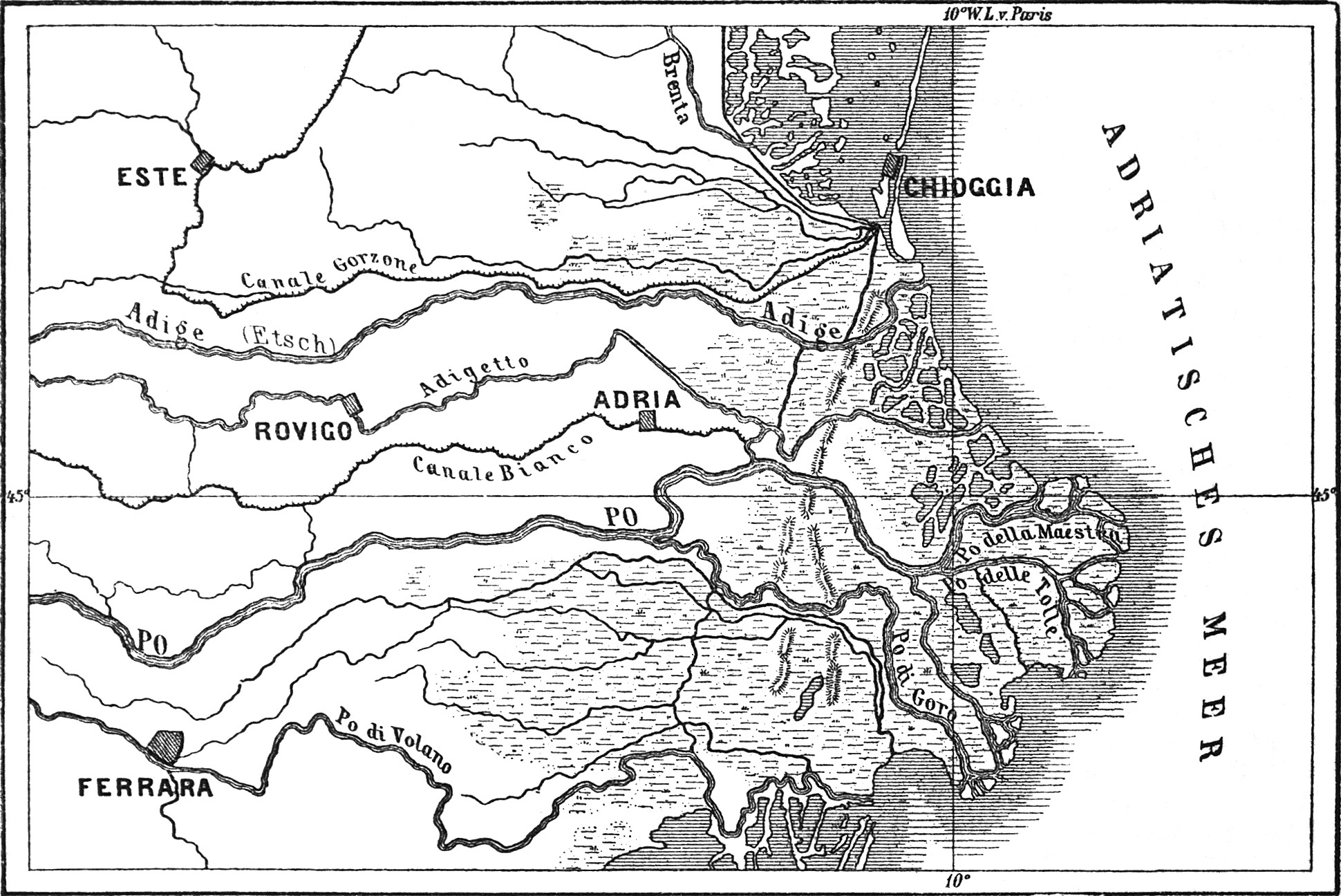
The middle and east parts of Polesine in 1885. You can note that the main courses of the Adige river and the Po river are those of nowadays.

The territory of the province was in ancient times inhabited by the Adriatic Venetians, who in the 12th century BC founded a settlement in what would later become the Etruscan city of Adria. During the 6th and 5th centuries BC both Etruscans and Venetians inhabited the area, followed by the Romans. In the Middle Ages the region was ruled by the Este as part of the Duchy of Ferrara, but Rovigo was not an administrative unit of the duchy, and there was more than one Podesteria for each side of the Po river.

After the War of Ferrara in 1484 the Republic of Venice started ruling over the northern part of Polesine; the Venetians designated it a territorio whose capital was Rovigo, thus giving the area an administrative unity for the first time. This can be viewed as the start of the province of Rovigo, though its extent was a less than today; the borders were set as the Canal Bianco river with few exceptions: the territories of Polesella, Guarda Veneta, Adria and the delta of the Po were included in the Venetian territorio of Rovigo.

After the Congress of Vienna in 1815 all the territories to the north of the Po were included into the Kingdom of Lombardy–Venetia, thus giving the province its modern extent.

== Geography ==
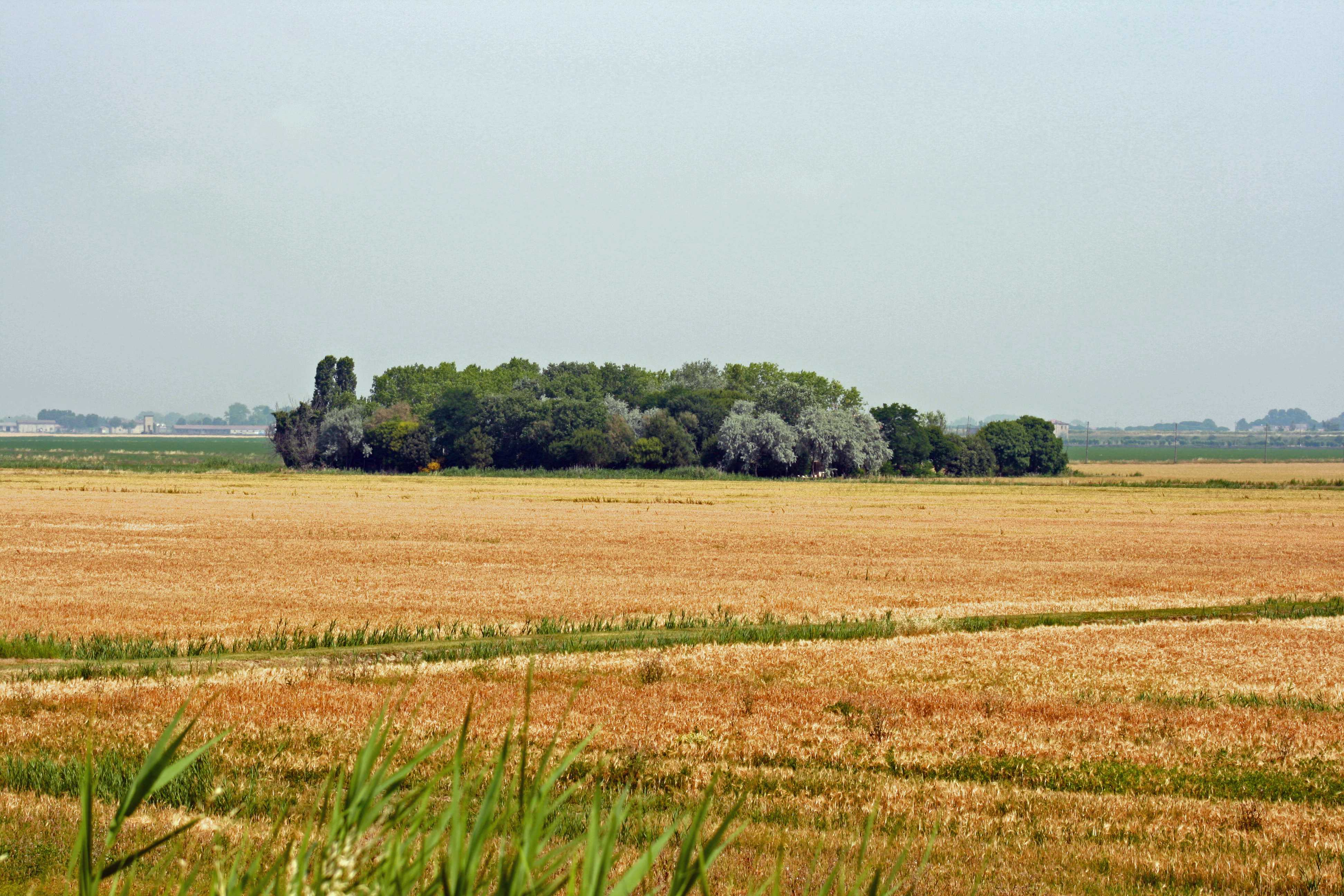
Countryside between Po di Goro and Po di Gnocca

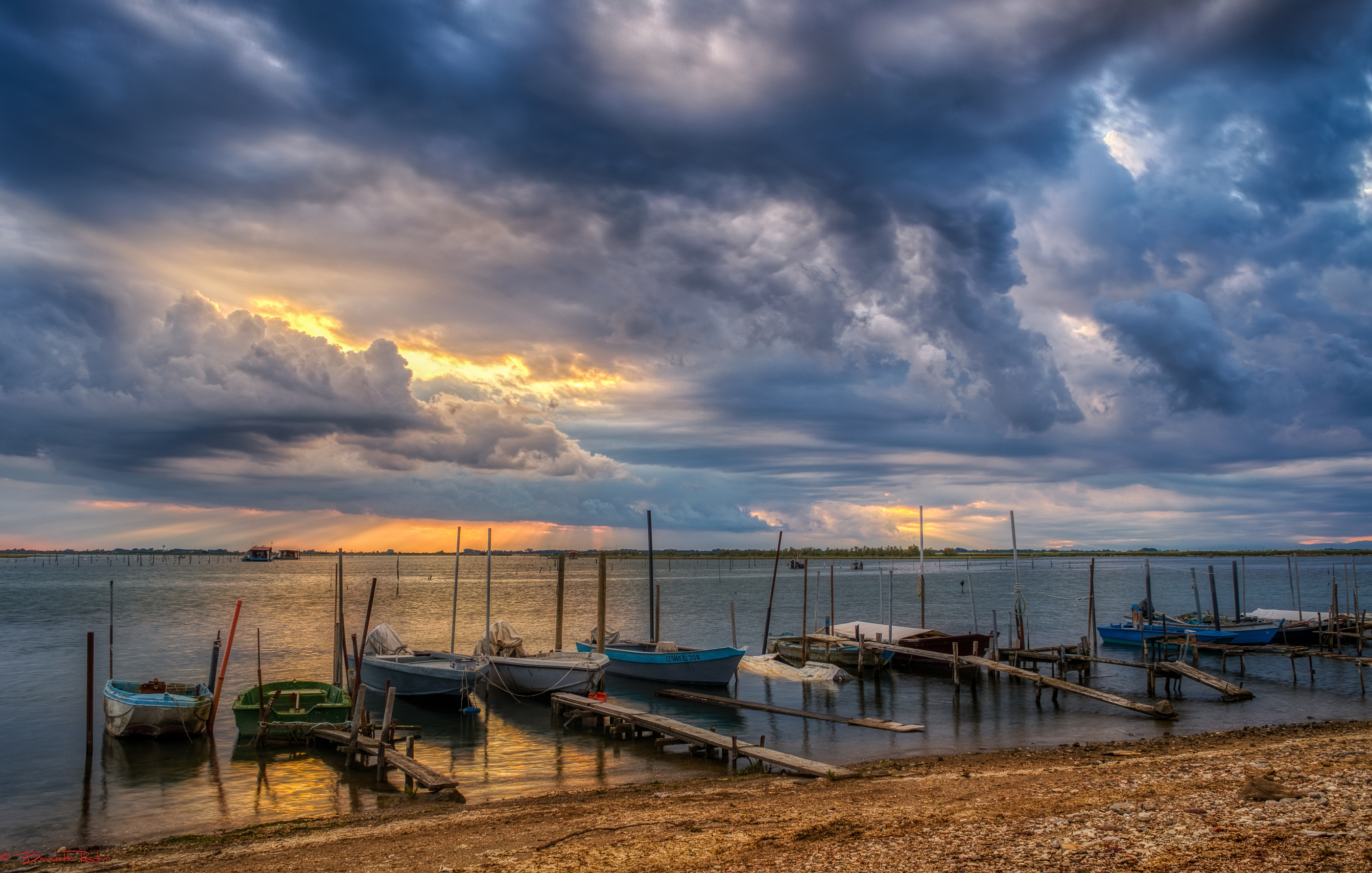
Caleri Lagoon

The province of Rovigo corresponds with or is full included into contemporary Polesine.

It has an area of 1,789 square kilometres (691 mi^{2}) and a total population of 244,625 inhabitants (2005). It is a plain whose elevation is from −2 to 15 metres (−7 to 49 ft).

The northern border is set on the Adige river from Badia Polesine to the sea, except for the territory of Cavarzere (in the province of Venice); the southern border is set on the Po river from Melara to the sea. The province includes the whole delta of the Po and the border is set on the Po di Goro channel of the delta.

The rivers Po and Adige have had a stable course only in recent times. The land is of relatively recent formation, created by drifts taken by the rivers, and subsidence occurs due to natural consolidation as well as to human activities such as drainage, groundwater extraction and methane extraction.

The Canal Bianco is the only other river that flows across the province. Many canals for drainage have been dug in the province of Rovigo because the Po and the Adige are the first and the third biggest rivers of Italy as for rate of flow and the land has a huge amount of water to deal with; the main canals are the Collettore Padano, the Ceresolo and the Valdentro.

Other streams of historic importance are the Adigetto (a former course of the Adige), the Poazzo (a former course of the Po) and the Fossa Polesella (a former waterway connecting the Canal Bianco with the Po).

The climate is mild continental with high humidity, having sultry summers and foggy winters; precipitation is normal, usually happens in spring and autumn.

=== Delta and nature delta park ===
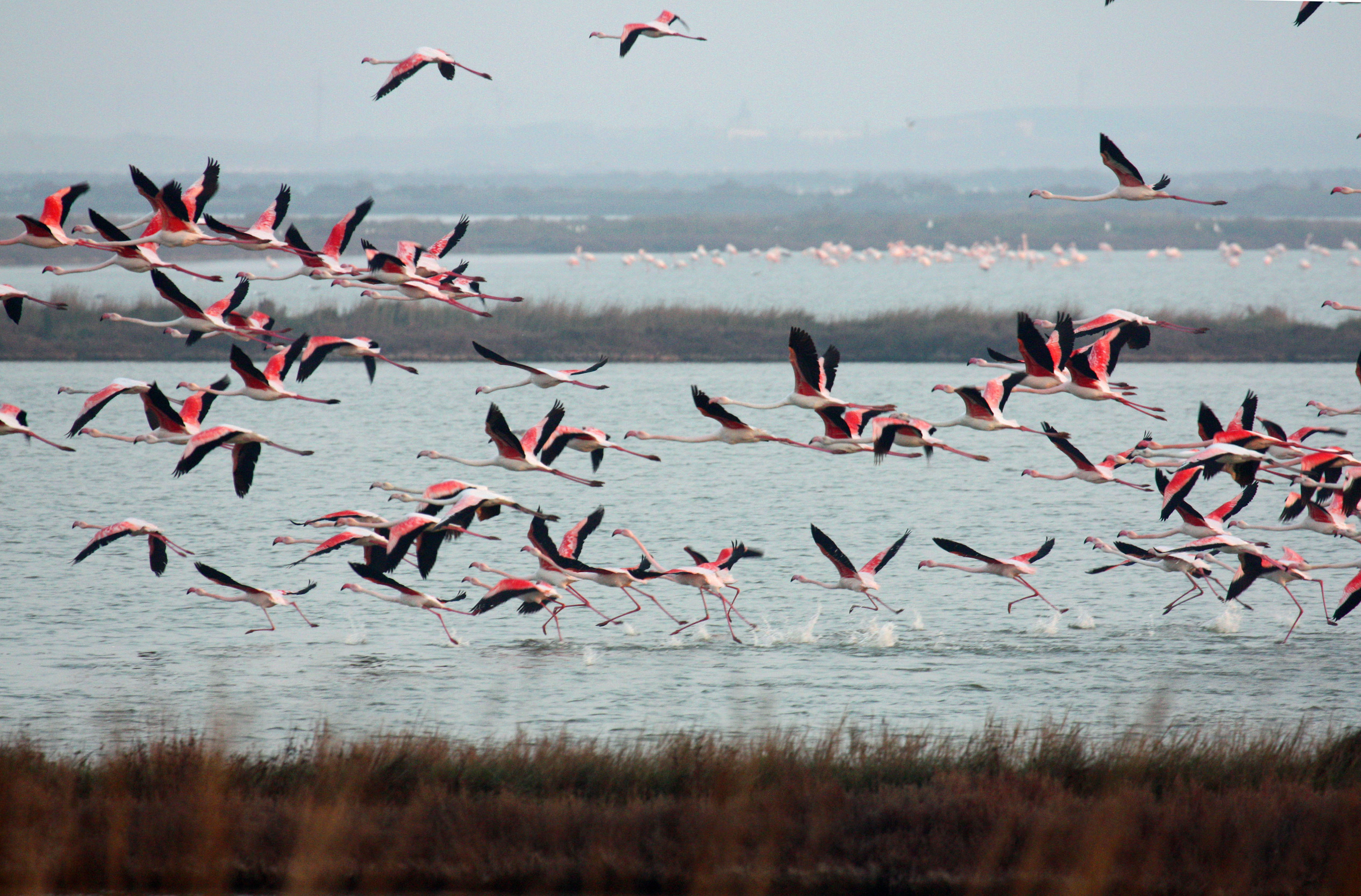
Flamingos in the delta of the Po river

The eastern portion of the province corresponds with the delta of River Po, a large area where the river subdivides into channels (each with its own name). The delta is also a protected area, because it's a national-legally recognized nature park.

=== Municipalities ===
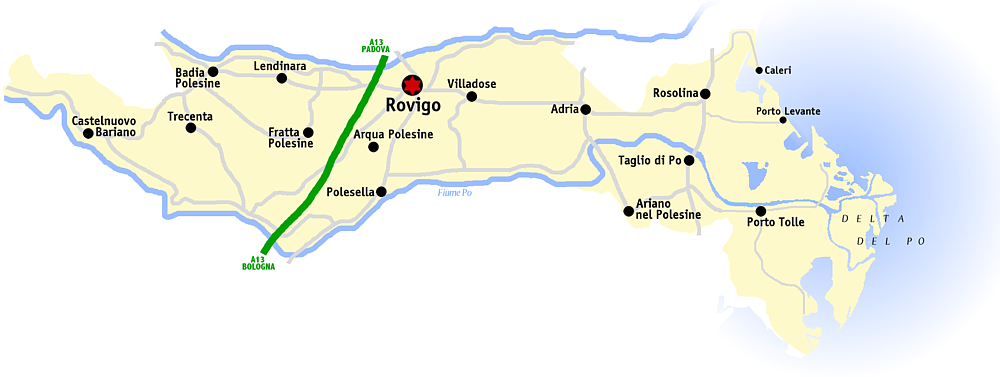
Cities, towns and roads of the province of Rovigo

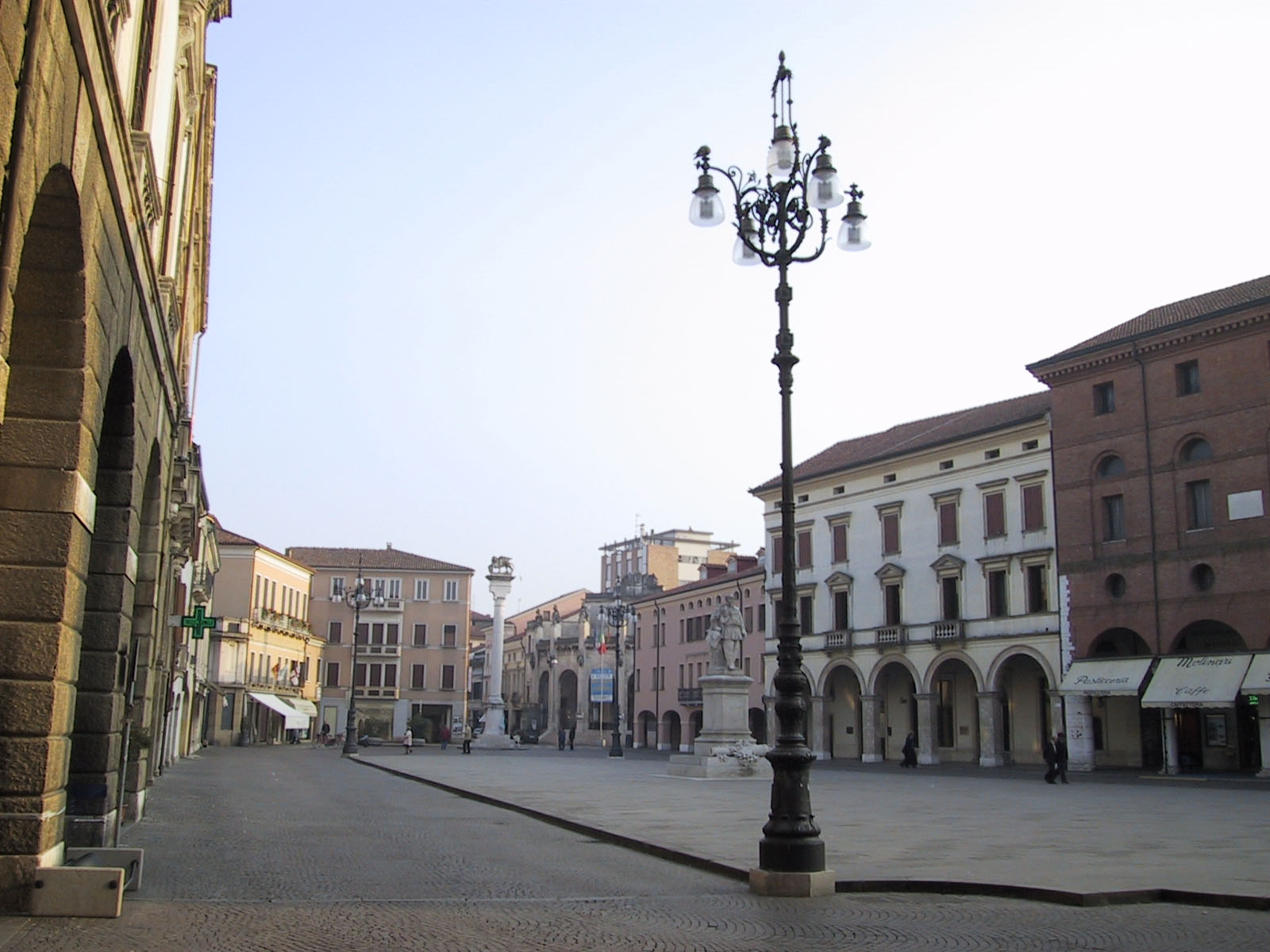
Rovigo

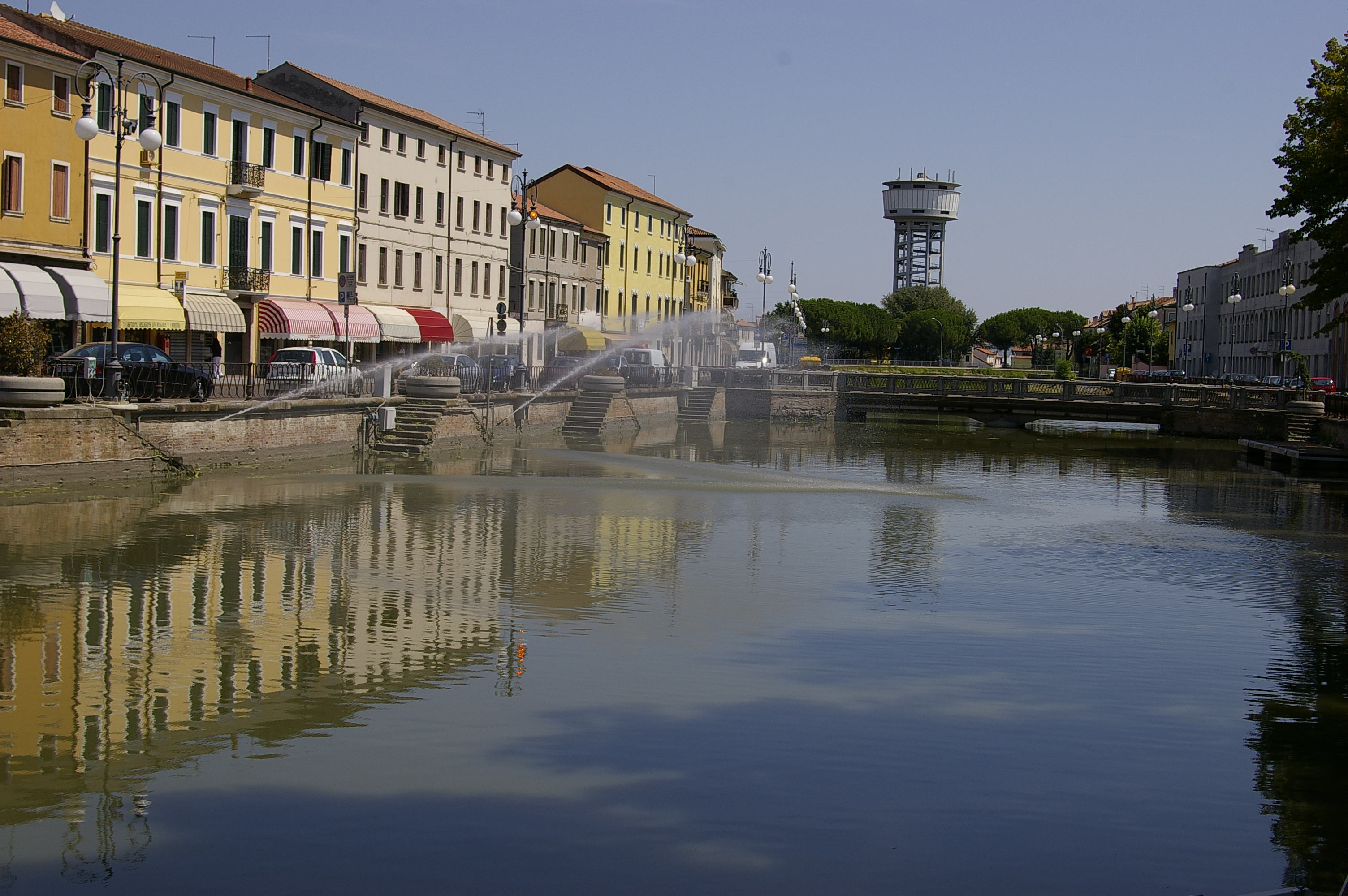
Adria

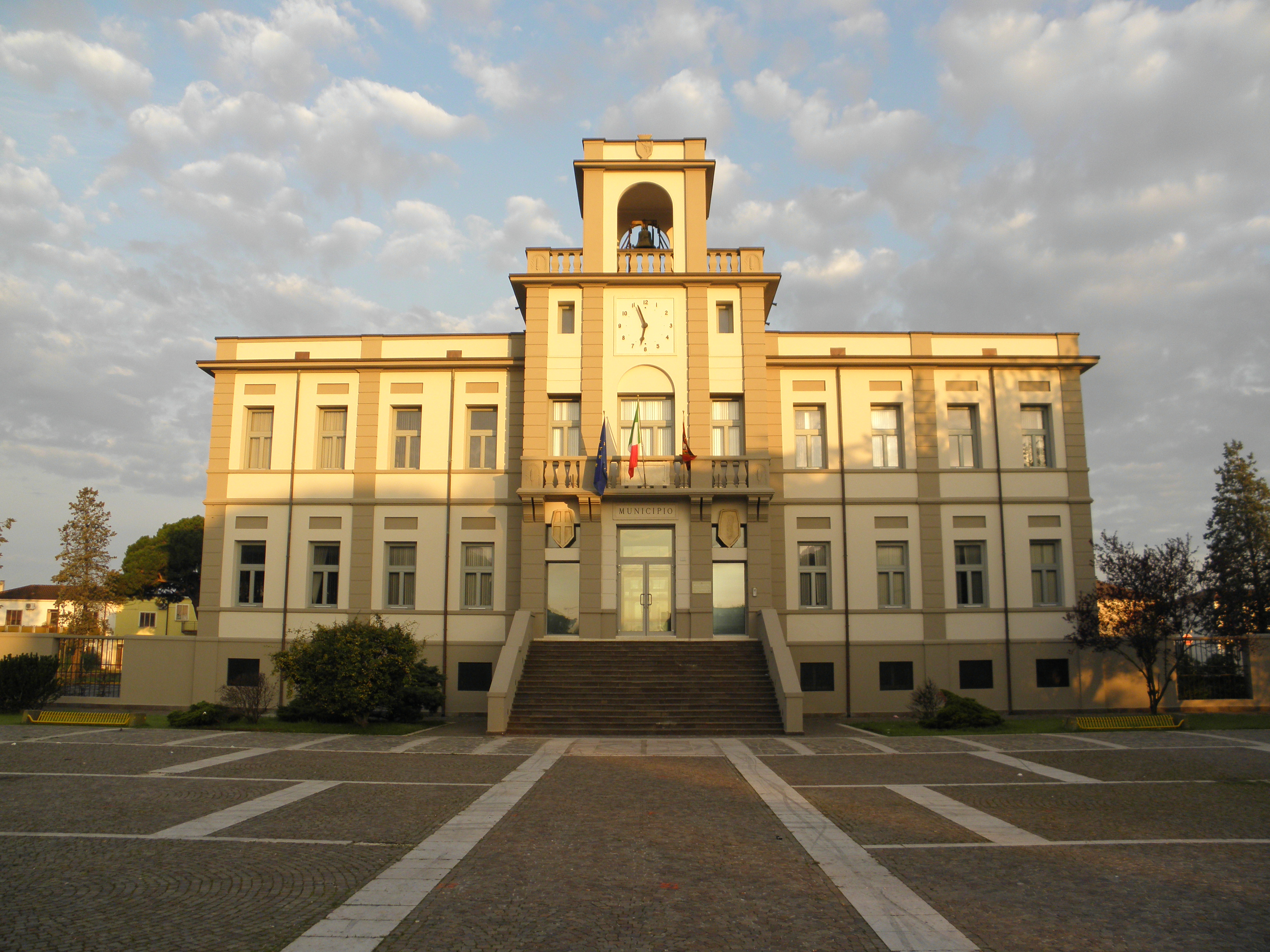
Porto Viro

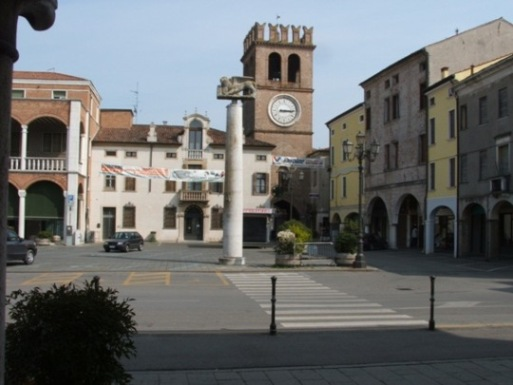
Lendinara

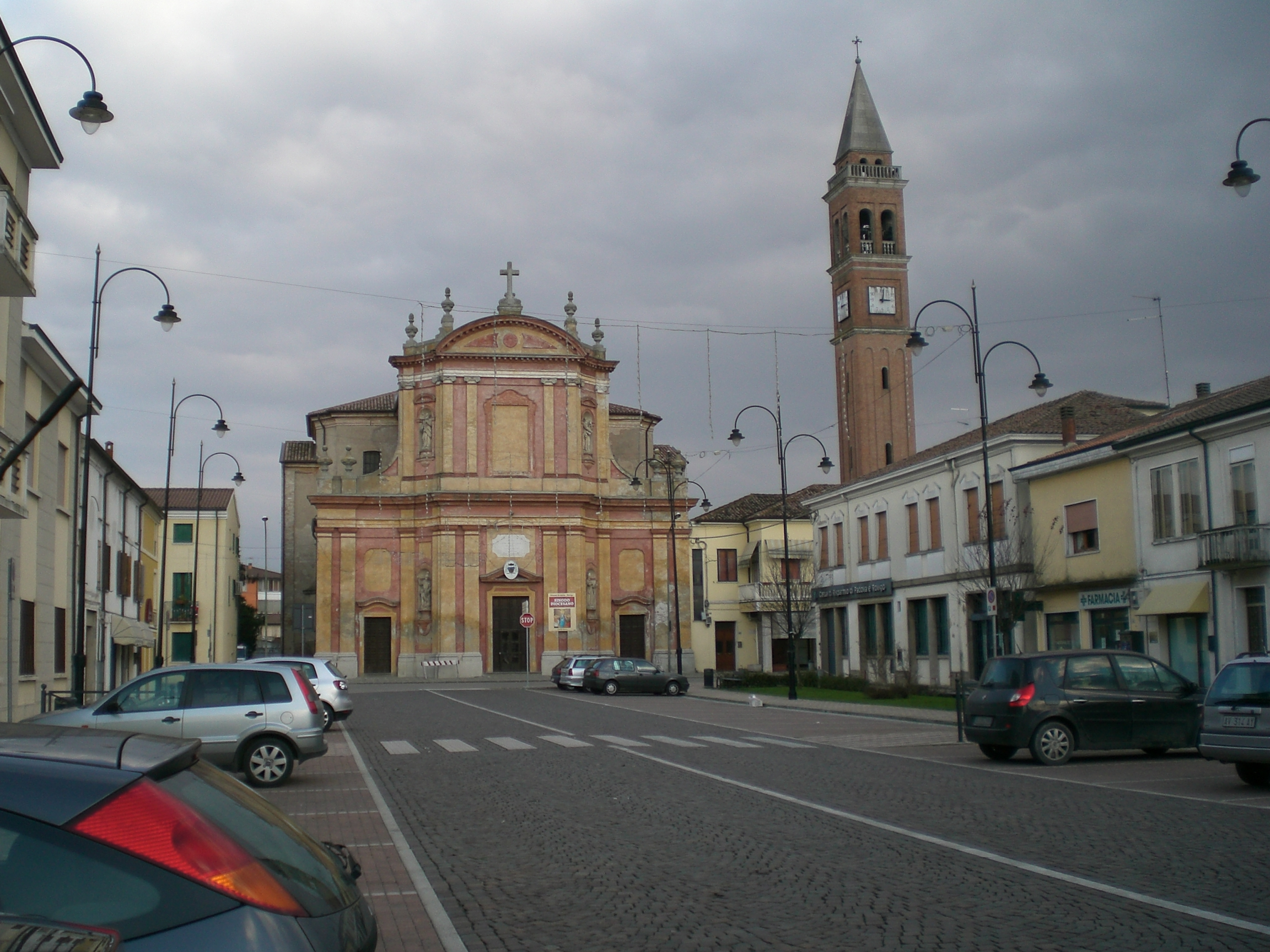
Occhiobello

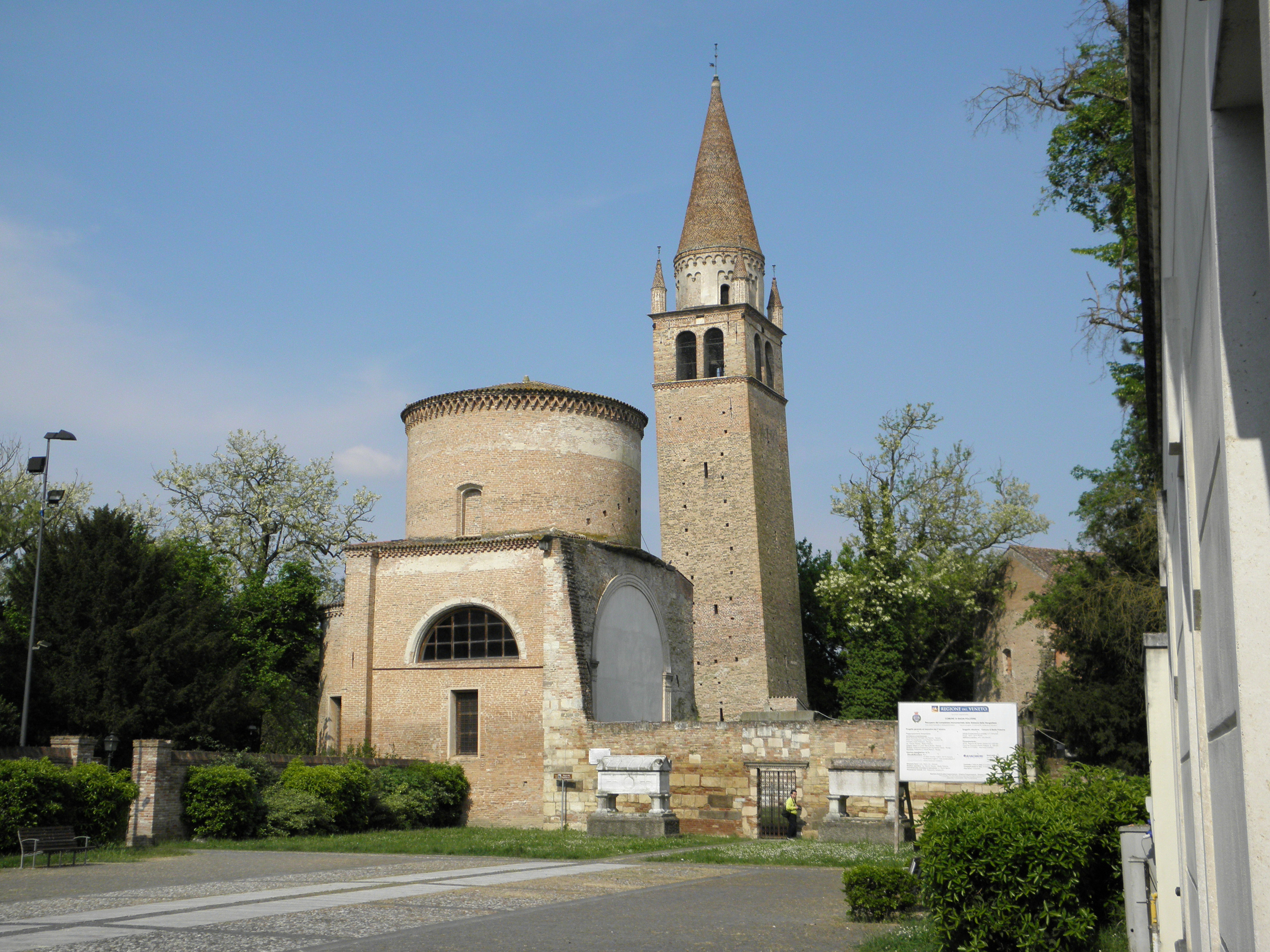
Badia Polesine

The province has 50 municipalities:

- Adria
- Ariano nel Polesine
- Arquà Polesine
- Badia Polesine
- Bagnolo di Po
- Bergantino
- Bosaro
- Calto
- Canaro
- Canda
- Castelguglielmo
- Castelmassa
- Castelnovo Bariano
- Ceneselli
- Ceregnano
- Corbola
- Costa di Rovigo
- Crespino
- Ficarolo
- Fiesso Umbertiano
- Frassinelle Polesine
- Fratta Polesine
- Gaiba
- Gavello
- Giacciano con Baruchella
- Guarda Veneta
- Lendinara
- Loreo
- Lusia
- Melara
- Occhiobello
- Papozze
- Pettorazza Grimani
- Pincara
- Polesella
- Pontecchio Polesine
- Porto Tolle
- Porto Viro
- Rosolina
- Rovigo
- Salara
- San Bellino
- San Martino di Venezze
- Stienta
- Taglio di Po
- Trecenta
- Villadose
- Villamarzana
- Villanova del Ghebbo
- Villanova Marchesana

== Demographics ==
As of 2026, the population is 227,183, of which 49.5% are male, and 50.5% are female. Minors make up 12.4% of the population, and seniors make up 29.0%.

Historical population

Year	Pop.	±%
1861	-	—
1871	202,232	—
1881	218,574	+8.1%
1901	222,057	+1.6%
1911	261,771	+17.9%
1921	289,379	+10.5%
1931	317,773	+9.8%
1936	336,807	+6.0%

Year	Pop.	±%
1951	357,963	+6.3%
1961	277,811	−22.4%
1971	251,908	−9.3%
1981	253,508	+0.6%
1991	248,004	−2.2%
2001	242,538	−2.2%
2011	242,349	−0.1%
2021	228,902	−5.5%

Source: ISTAT

=== Migration ===
As of 2025, immigrants make up 10.8% of the population. The 5 largest foreign countries of birth are Morocco, Romania, China, Albania, and Moldova.

The province of Rovigo suffers the emigration phenomenon even nowadays: young people still use to emigrate to more developed areas of Veneto and of Italy; this leads to population ageing. There are still migrations from rural areas to more developed towns within the boundaries of the province.

== Economy ==
The province is characterized by a thriving agriculture, particularly the cultivation of wheat, maize, rice and sugar beets as well as grapevines, apples, pears, peaches, tomatoes and vegetables.

There are small to medium size factories set in the city of Rovigo and few other centres of the province: they mainly are about food processing (many are sugar refineries), metalworking, carpentry, textile, construction and construction materials. Many Aquaculture farms are set in the wetlands of the delta of the Po.

The province of Rovigo has some famous holiday villages, as Rosolina Mare, Rosa Pineta, and Albarella Island (Isola di Albarella in Italian).

== Transport ==
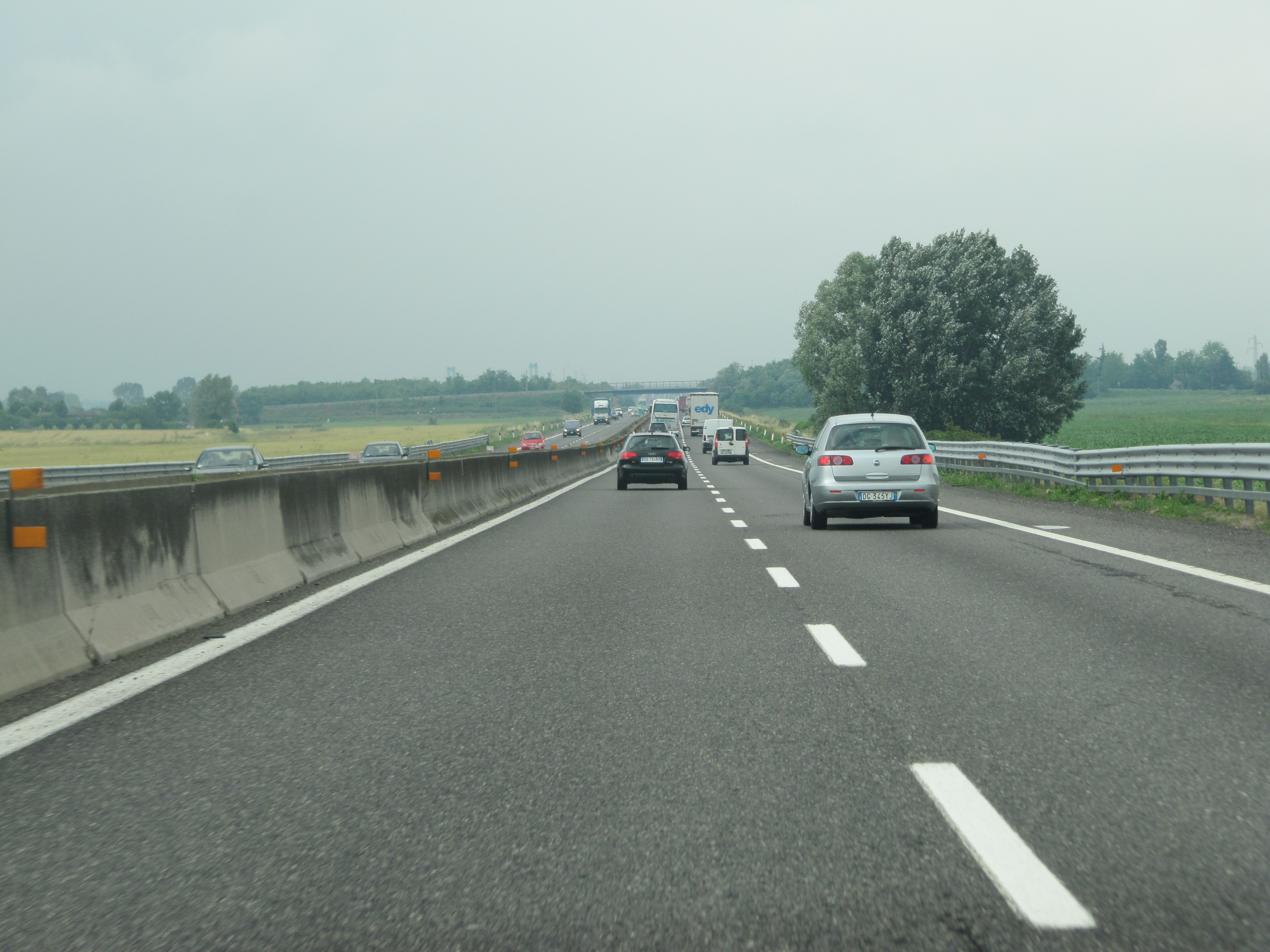
Autostrada A13 near Rovigo

The SS434 "Transpolesana", a long highway, connects Verona with Rovigo and crosses the western part of the province. Autostrada A31 toll motorway, connecting Bologna with Padua, A31, connecting Badia Polesine and SS434 Transpolesana with Piovene Rocchette, and SS309 "Romea" State Road, connecting Venice with Ravenna, pass through the zone. The Autostrada A13 exits in the province of Rovigo are Occhiobello, Villamarzana-Rovigo sud and Rovigo, while the only A31 exits in the province are Badia Polesine and the final junction with SS434. Notable railways crossing the province are the Padua–Bologna railway, the Rovigo–Chioggia railway and the Verona–Rovigo railway.

== See also ==
- Bishopric of Adria – for ecclesiastical matters
