= Castelmassa =

- Comune
- Comune di Castelmassa
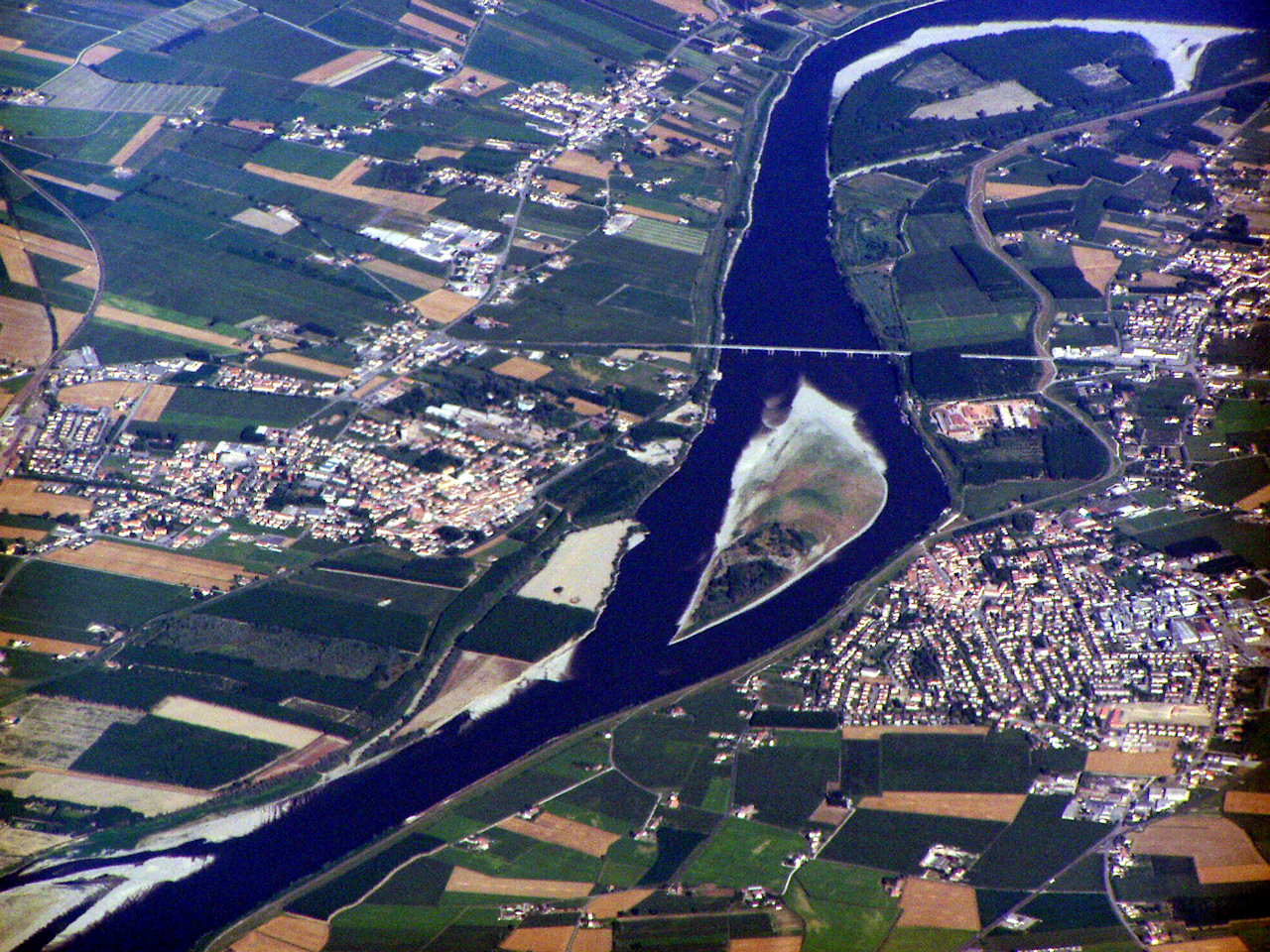
- Castelmassa on the right

- Location within Italy Location within Veneto
- Coordinates: 45°1′N 11°19′E
- Country: Italy
- Region: Veneto
- Province: Rovigo (RO)

Government
  - Mayor: Eugenio Boschini

Area
  - Total: 11.84 km^{2} (4.57 sq mi)
- Elevation: 12 m (39 ft)

Population (30 June 2017)
  - Total: 4,138
  - Density: 349.5/km^{2} (905.2/sq mi)
- Demonym: Castelmassesi
- Time zone: UTC+1 (CET)
  - Summer (DST): UTC+2 (CEST)
- Postal code: 45035
- Dialing code: 0425
- Patron saint: St. Stephen
- Saint day: 26 December
- Website: Official website

Castelmassa is a comune (municipality) in the Province of Rovigo in the Italian region Veneto, located about 90 kilometres (56 mi) southwest of Venice and about 35 kilometres (22 mi) west of Rovigo. Castelmassa borders the following municipalities: Calto, Castelnovo Bariano, Ceneselli, Felonica, Sermide.

== People ==
- Bonaventura Porta, (1866–1953), bishop of Pesaro

== Twin towns ==
Castelmassa is twinned with:

- Gniew, Poland
