= Ficarolo =

- Comune
- Comune di Ficarolo
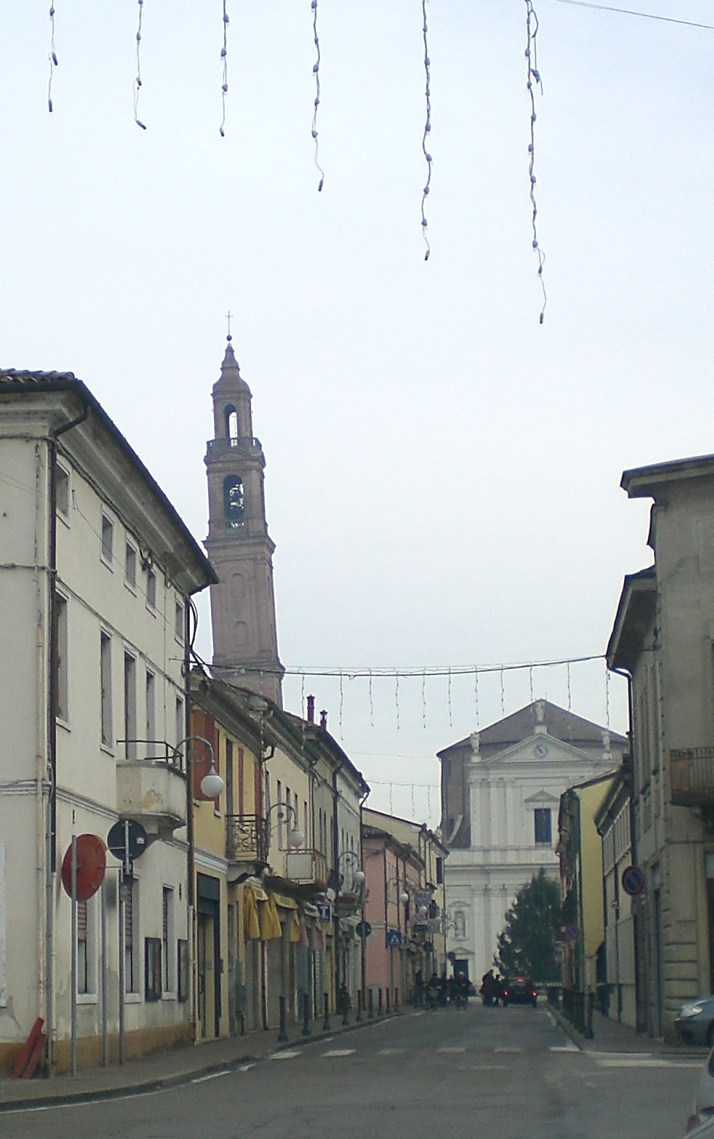

- Location within Italy Location within Veneto
- Coordinates: 44°57′N 11°26′E
- Country: Italy
- Region: Veneto
- Province: Rovigo (RO)

Government
  - Mayor: abiano Pigaian

Area
  - Total: 18.08 km^{2} (6.98 sq mi)
- Elevation: 10 m (33 ft)

Population (31 July 2017)
  - Total: 2,407
  - Density: 133.1/km^{2} (344.8/sq mi)
- Demonym: Ficarolesi
- Time zone: UTC+1 (CET)
  - Summer (DST): UTC+2 (CEST)
- Postal code: 45036
- Dialing code: 0425
- Website: Official website

Ficarolo is a comune (municipality) in the Province of Rovigo in the Italian region Veneto, located about 90 kilometres (56 mi) southwest of Venice and about 30 kilometres (19 mi) southwest of Rovigo.

Ficarolo borders the following municipalities: Bagnolo di Po, Bondeno, Ferrara, Gaiba, Salara, Sermide e Felonica.
