= Bagnolo di Po =

- Comune
- Comune di Bagnolo di Po
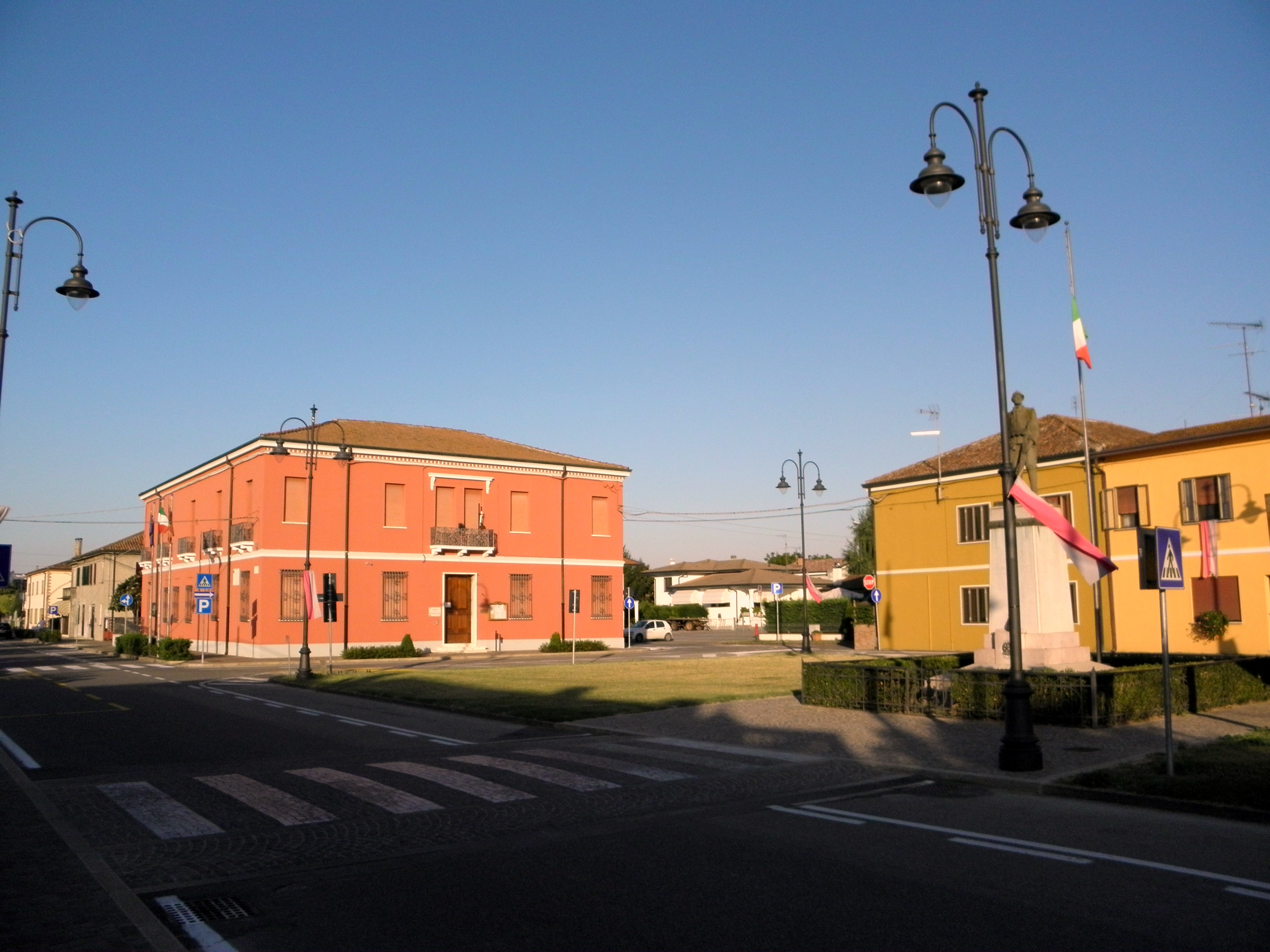
- Guglielmo Marconi Square and Town Hall in the centre of Bagnolo di Po

- Location within Italy Location within Veneto
- Coordinates: 45°01′N 11°30′E
- Country: Italy
- Region: Veneto
- Province: Rovigo (RO)
- Frazioni: Runzi

Government
  - Mayor: Pietro Caberletti

Area
  - Total: 21.36 km^{2} (8.25 sq mi)
- Elevation: 7 m (23 ft)

Population (30 April 2017)
  - Total: 1,239
  - Density: 58.01/km^{2} (150.2/sq mi)
- Demonym: Bagnolesi
- Time zone: UTC+1 (CET)
  - Summer (DST): UTC+2 (CEST)
- Postal code: 45022
- Dialing code: 0425
- Website: Official website

Bagnolo di Po is a comune in the province of Rovigo, in Veneto, northern Italy. It is bounded by other communes of Castelguglielmo, Trecenta, Canda, and Ficarolo.
