= Loreo =

Photography equipment manufacturer

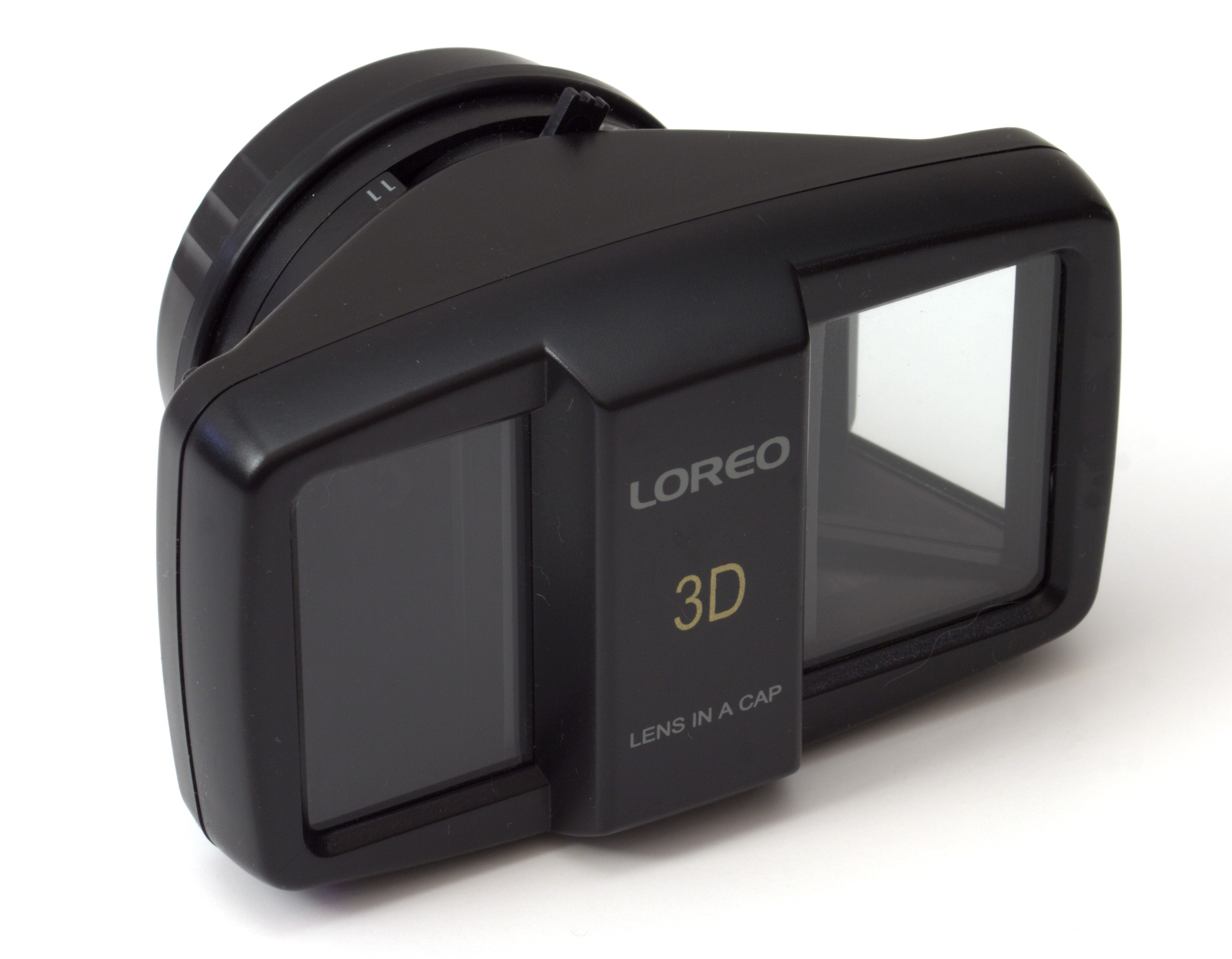
Loreo 3D lens

Loreo is a manufacturer of stereo photography equipment, including 3D cameras and stereo lens attachments for SLR cameras. Stereo pictures taken using Loreo systems are instantly viewable using 3D viewers without any cutting or remounting. These stereo photos are in the same format and size as any normal photograph, only they contain two images side by side. Some cameras produce cross eye stereo images, where the right-part of the photo is actually the left image and vice versa. Other cameras produce parallel stereo images, where left and right are not swapped. Loreo was founded in 1982, and is based in Hong Kong, China.
