= George Kemp =

George Kemp may refer to:

- George Kemp (baseball), American baseball player
- George Stephen Kemp, electrical engineer and assistant to Guglielmo Marconi
- George Meikle Kemp (1795–1844), Scottish carpenter/joiner, draughtsman, and self-taught architect
- George Kemp, 1st Baron Rochdale (1866–1945), British aristocrat
- George Hubert Kemp (1897–1918), World War I British flying ace

== See also ==
- George Kempe
