= Edward Edwin Glanville =

- Born: 1873; Blackrock, Dublin, Ireland
- Died: 21 August 1898 (aged 24–25); Rathlin Island
- Education: Trinity College Dublin

Edward Edwin Glanville (1873 – 21 August 1898), was an Irish engineer who assisted Guglielmo Marconi in his experiments in wireless telegraphy.

== Early life ==
Edward Edwin Glanville was born in 1873, in Blackrock. He entered Trinity College Dublin in 1891, studying mathematics and experimental science, graduating in 1895 with a first-class BA. Having been awarded a scholarship in 1895, Glanville undertook postgraduate work under Professor George Francis FitzGerald, passing his examinations in 1898.

== Career with Marconi ==
Glanville joined the company that was later known as the Marconi Wireless Telegraph Co. in July 1897. He worked for a time in London, before he was sent to conduct experiments on different types of aerials on the Salisbury Plain. Working with George Kemp, Glanville conducted transmission tests between Bournemouth and Alum Bay on the Isle of Wight in January 1898. Lord Kelvin inspected the installation in June 1898, and at his insistence, paid a shilling to send a message of G. G. Stokes, making this the first wireless transmission of a paid telegram.

Marconi sent Glanville and Kemp to Ireland in July 1898, to set up a wireless telegraphy link between Rathlin Island and Ballycastle. They sent the first test signals which were received on 6 July. That day, Marconi sent the pair to an annual regatta in Kingstown, County Dublin. Over the course of the two day event, the pair sent over 1700 reports of the yacht races to the shore, making this is first time wireless telegraphy was used at a sporting event. It also demonstrated the potential use of the system for communication at sea.

== Death on Rathlin Island ==
Glanville returned to Rathlin, and Kemp to Ballycastle, to resume the experiments there. Glanville fell from the cliffs on Rathlin Island while on a geology and bird-watching field trip and was declared missing on 21 August 1898. His body was recovered on 22 August, and sent back to Dublin, where he was buried on 26 August. Marconi attended Glanville's funeral.
