= Marconi Museum and Mausoleum =

Buildings in Emilia-Romagna, Italy

Coordinates: 44.431351°N 11.267684°E

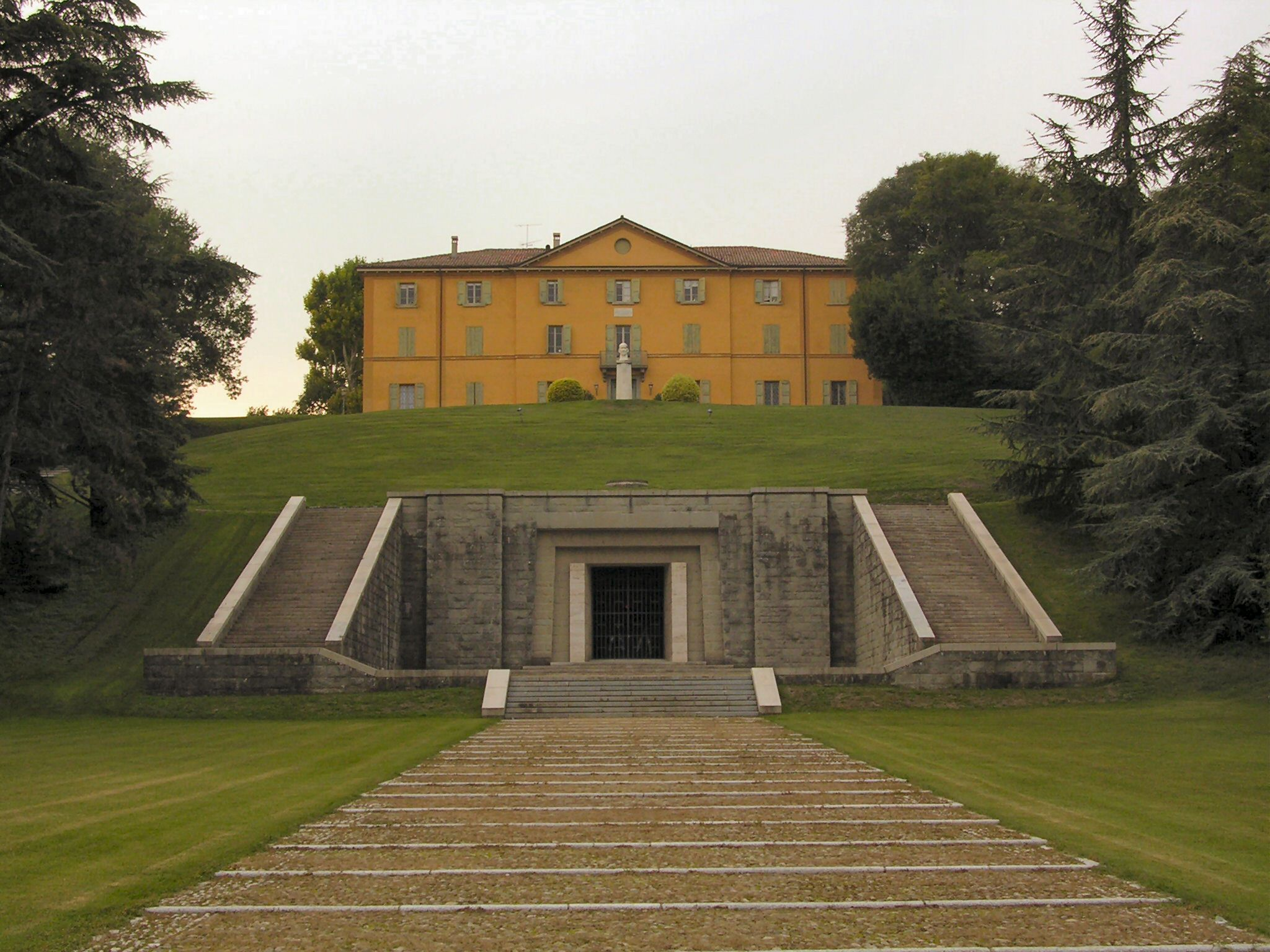
Villa Marconi in background with Marconi's tomb in foreground

The Museum and Mausoleum of Guglielmo Marconi is a museum and burial structure for the Italian scientist, inventor, and engineer, Guglielmo Marconi. The tomb is located adjacent to the 17th-century Villa Griffone/Villa Marconi, located on via Celestini #1 in Pontecchio Marconi, about 15 kilometers outside the city of Bologna in Emilia Romagna, Italy.

== Museum and Foundation ==
The Marconi Museum (Museo Marconi) celebrates the discoveries and advances of Guglielmo Marconi in the areas of electricity and radio communication, as well as a general history of the development of radiocommunication. It houses some of the scientific instruments and products used and developed by Marconi and others. The villa also houses the Fondazione Guglielmo Marconi and the Ugo Bordoni Foundation.

== Mausoleum ==
A few years after the death of Marconi in 1937, in the midst of the Second World War, the Mussolini government interred Guglielmo, who had been an avowed fascist sympathizer, and his second wife Maria Cristina Bezzi Scali in an underground hypogeum-tomb, designed by Marcello Piacentini, and sporting a column with Marconi's bust by Arturo Dazzi. The tomb, as with many fascist architectural monuments, hearkens back to Etruscan civilization and ancient Roman models of tombs with a simple entrance to an underground chamber beneath a tumulus.
