= Palazzo Dall'Armi Marescalchi, Bologna =

Palazzo Dall'Armi Marescalchi
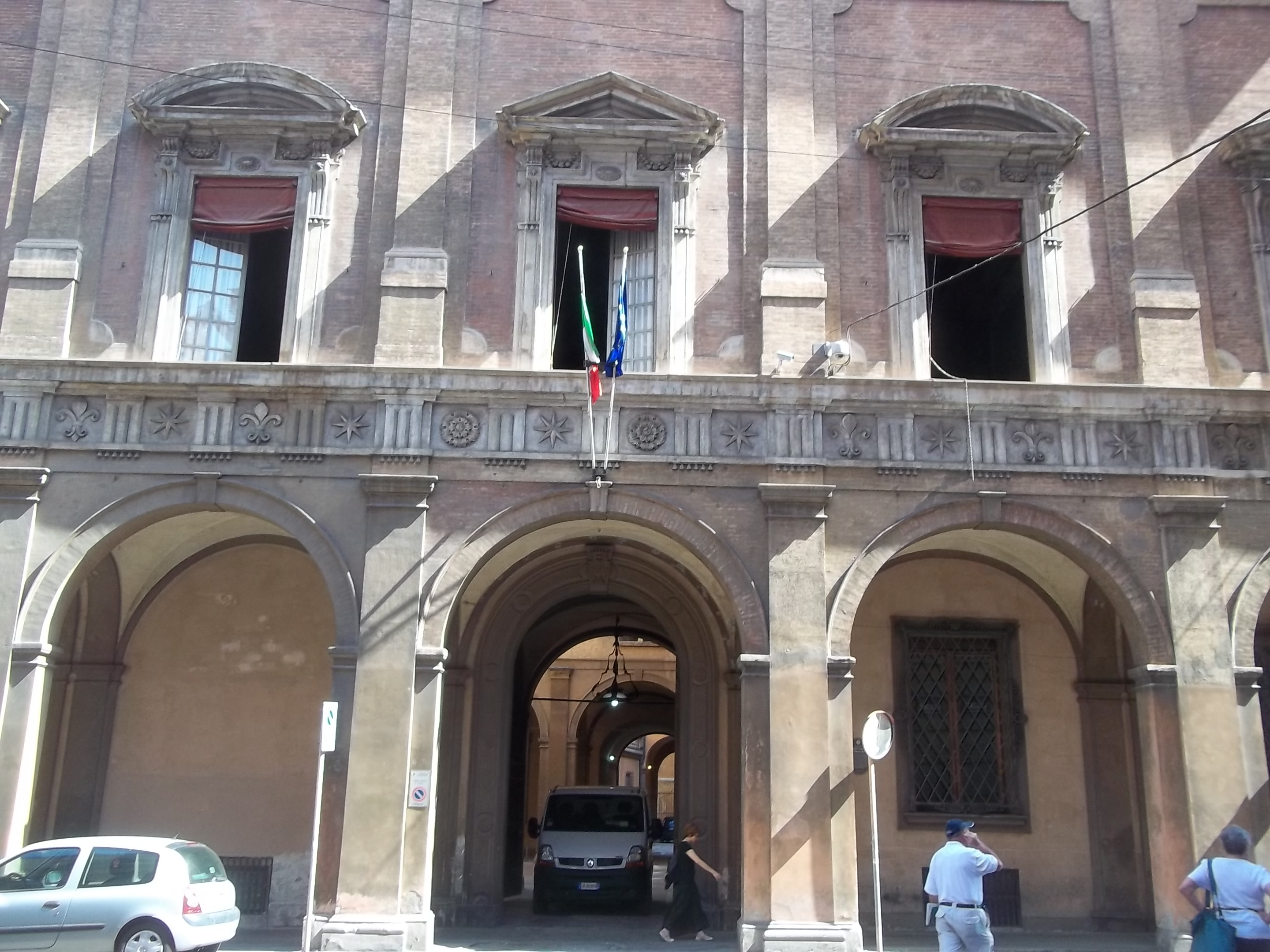
- Interactive map of the Palazzo Dall'Armi Marescalchi area

General information
- Location: Bologna, Bologna
- Coordinates: 44.494159°N 11.339504°E
- Groundbreaking: 1466

The Palazzo Dall'Armi Marescalchi is a Baroque style palace in central Bologna, Italy.

The palace was initially constructed in 1466, and rebuilt in 1613 by Floriano Ambrosini. The Marescalchi name was added when Eleonora D'Armi married Senator Vincenzo Marescalchi.

In the 1700s, further lands and gardens were added. In the 19th century further reconstruction was pursued. The scientist Guglielmo Marconi was born in the palace. In 1961 it was acquired by the Ministry of the Treasury, and converted to house the Soprintendenza per i Beni Ambientali e Architettonici of the Province of Emilia. Some of the rooms on the main floor retain frescoes by Ludovico Carracci and Guido Reni. The large oval hall was frescoed by Felice Giani in 1780.

The palace suffered during the bombardments of World War II.
