= Sasso Marconi =

- Comune
- Comune di Sasso Marconi
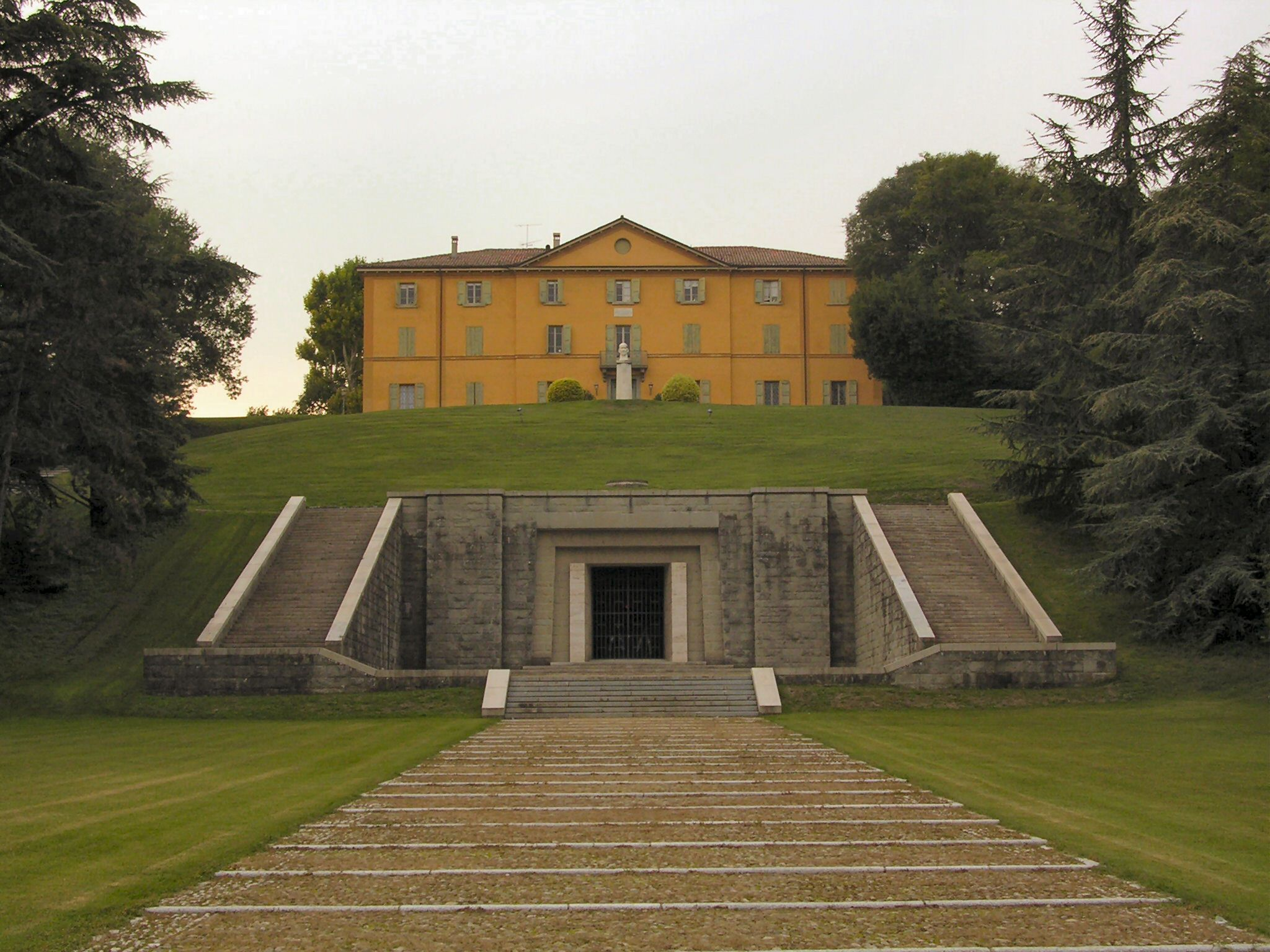
- Villa Marconi with Marconi Museum and Mausoleum

- Coat of arms

- Location within Italy Location within Emilia-Romagna
- Coordinates: 44°24′N 11°15′E
- Country: Italy
- Region: Emilia-Romagna
- Metropolitan city: Bologna (BO)
- Frazioni: Borgonuovo, Pontecchio Marconi, Fontana, Capital, Tignano-Roma, Rasiglio-Scopeto, Iano, Lagune, Cinque Cerri

Government
  - Mayor: Stefano Mazzetti

Area
  - Total: 96.45 km^{2} (37.24 sq mi)
- Elevation: 128 m (420 ft)

Population (31 December 2014)
  - Total: 14,612
  - Density: 151.5/km^{2} (392.4/sq mi)
- Demonym: Sassesi
- Time zone: UTC+1 (CET)
  - Summer (DST): UTC+2 (CEST)
- Postal code: 40037
- Dialing code: 051
- Patron saint: Sts. Peter and Paul
- Saint day: 29 June
- Website: Official website

Sasso Marconi (Bolognese: Al Sâs) is a town and comune of the Metropolitan City of Bologna in northern Italy, 17 kilometres (11 mi) south-southwest of Bologna.

Known as Sasso Bolognese until 1938, it is named after Guglielmo Marconi, the radio pioneer, who was born in the nearby city of Bologna. His villa now contains the Marconi Museum and Mausoleum. The name Sasso ("rock") derives from the Pliocene-age rock formation called Sasso della Glosina that commands the confluence of the Setta and Reno rivers.

== Sport ==
- ASD Sasso Marconi 1924

== Twin cities ==
- (United Kingdom) Helston, UK
- Sassenage, France
- Siderno, Italy
