= George Hubert Kemp =

British WWI flying ace (1897–1918)

- Born: 1897; Harrow, Middlesex, England
- Died: 1 June 1918 (aged 20-21); France
- Burial place: Longuenesse Souvenir Cemetery; Longuenesse, Pas-de-Calais, France; 50.73088°N 2.25126°E
- Military career
- Allegiance: United Kingdom
- Branch: British Army; Royal Air Force
- Service years: 1917–1918
- Rank: Second Lieutenant
- Units: 15th Battalion Durham Light Infantry; Royal Flying Corps; No. 20 Squadron RAF

Second Lieutenant George Hubert Kemp (1897 – 1 June 1918) was a World War I British flying ace credited with twelve aerial victories. He served with the Durham Light Infantry, Royal Flying Corps, and Royal Air Force. The observer ace scored his last victory shortly before his death at age twenty in aerial combat over France.

== Background ==
George Hubert Kemp, son of George and Margaret Kemp, was born in 1897 in Harrow, Middlesex, England. He was the second of three sons. In 1901, his family lived in Willesden, Middlesex, England. By 1911, the family resided at 30 Wyndcliff Road in Charlton, London, England. He was educated at The John Roan School in Greenwich. Prior to joining the military, George Jr. was employed at the Port of London Authority. His father was a metal manufacturer's clerk. In 1918, his brothers William and Leslie were both in military service, one in active service in France, and the other a prisoner of war in Germany.

== Military career ==
In 1917, George Kemp received a commission in the 15th Battalion of the Durham Light Infantry. While serving with that regiment, he was wounded at Chérisy, Pas-de-Calais, France. His rank was that of second lieutenant, which he again had when he transferred to the Royal Flying Corps in 1918. He was posted to No. 20 Squadron of the Royal Air Force. Kemp was credited with twelve aerial victories as an observer, all from the Bristol F.2b and with William McKenzie Thomson as his pilot.

On 9 May 1918, observer Kemp and pilot Thomson, in Bristol F.2b (C4851) were cut off from their formation by an Albatros D.V. Kemp emptied a drum into the Albatros which side-slipped and nose-dived, and was destroyed, crashing between Comines and Wervicq. This was Kemp's first victory. His next four were all from Bristol (C859). On 14 May 1918, Kemp scored his second aerial victory. He and his pilot followed an Albatros D.V down to 4,000 feet and fired about 100 rounds at it over the Wervicq and Zillebeke, West Flanders. The enemy plane crashed and the crew was captured. While on a patrol with other Bristol Fighters on 17 May 1918, Kemp and Thomson engaged a formation of enemy aircraft. They dived on an Albatros D.V, and fired a burst of about 200 rounds into it. It went down in a vertical dive and was destroyed, crashing between Armentières and Lille. Kemp scored a double victory that day, as another Albatros D.V was sent out of control over Armentières. On 18 May 1918, Kemp scored his fifth victory when a Pfalz D.III was sent out of control south of Merville, Nord.

All seven of Kemp's remaining aerial victories (6–12) were from Bristol F.2b (C843). On 19 May 1918, Kemp and Thomson were on a patrol with No. 20 Squadron when they engaged about twenty enemy aircraft. As Thomson dived on a Pfalz D.III, Kemp fired three drums into it. The Pfalz was destroyed, crashing into a house at Estaires. Kemp racked up his seventh win on 21 May 1918 when an Albatros D.V was destroyed in flames over Warneton. His eighth was the result of an Albatros D.V that was sent out of control over Bac St Maur on 29 May 1918. Two days later, on 31 May 1918, Second Lieutenant Kemp scored a double victory when a Pfalz D.III was destroyed over Bois-Grenier and, minutes later, an Albatros D.V was sent out of control over Armentières. On 1 June 1918, Kemp earned his final two victories (11 and 12) when two Albatros D.V aircraft were destroyed over Comines.

== Death ==
Second Lieutenant Kemp and Lieutenant Thomson were cut off from their patrol and attacked by four enemy planes on 1 June 1918. Thomson turned and fired 200 rounds into an Albatros D.V, which crashed. Observer Kemp shot down another over Comines. They were then attacked by an Albatros scout from above. During that encounter, Kemp, age 20, was fatally wounded. Pilot Thomson spun down to 2,000 feet, and then turned and fired upon the Albatros, driving it off. Thomson successfully flew his aircraft home.

A portion of the letter from No. 20 Squadron commanding officer to Kemp's parents reads: "You have no doubt been advised by the War Office that your son has unfortunately been killed in action. It happened during a fight with about 15 enemy machines. One enemy machine with the sun behind him surprised your son and his pilot and dived on them before anything could be done. Before your son was killed however he had shot down one of the enemy machines and his pilot eventually shot down another. He and his pilot have done excellent work together and both have been recommended for awards. I am particularly sorry to lose your son as he was just the type of conscientiously brave officer that one looks forward to having. He was extraordinarily keen on his work and looked forward to the day when he could learn to fly himself. Death must have been instantaneous as he was hit in the head and heart..."

Second Lieutenant George Hubert Kemp was interred at Longuenesse (St. Omer) Souvenir Cemetery at Rue Louis Delattre, between that road and Route des Bruyères in Longuenesse, Pas-de-Calais, France. His grave reference is V. B. 56. The inscription on his headstone reads: "Second Lieutenant George Hubert Kemp, Durham Light Infantry, Attd. Royal Air Force, 1 June 1918 Age 20, To A Cheery, Loving, Loyal Son, Brother, Friend, Let This Bear Tribute."

== War memorabilia ==
In 2002, an auction of Lieutenant Kemp's war memorabilia was held. The items included his British War and Victory medals, his memorial plaque, and photocopies of original documents, research materials, and photographs, as well as the British War and Victory medals of his brother, Private Leslie Newton Kemp. Despite twelve aerial victories, having been wounded twice, the second time fatally, and a recommendation for an award, George Hubert Kemp was not decorated. Lieutenant Thomson received the Military Cross shortly after the encounter. Later that year, he received the Distinguished Flying Cross. He died 9 July 1987.

== Gallery of aircraft ==
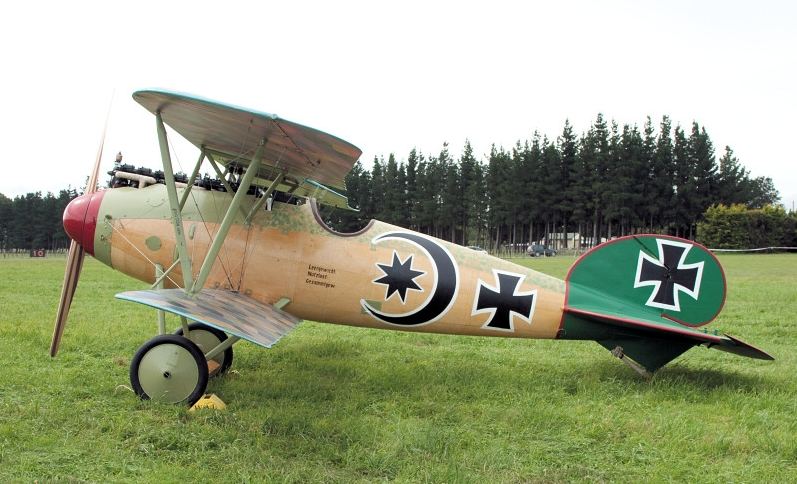
Albatros D.V
Victories 1–4,7,8,10–12

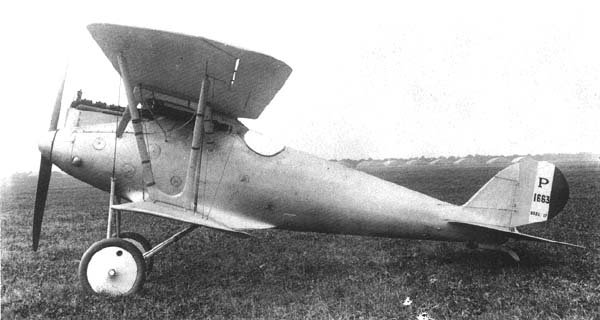
Pfalz D.III
Victories 5,6,9

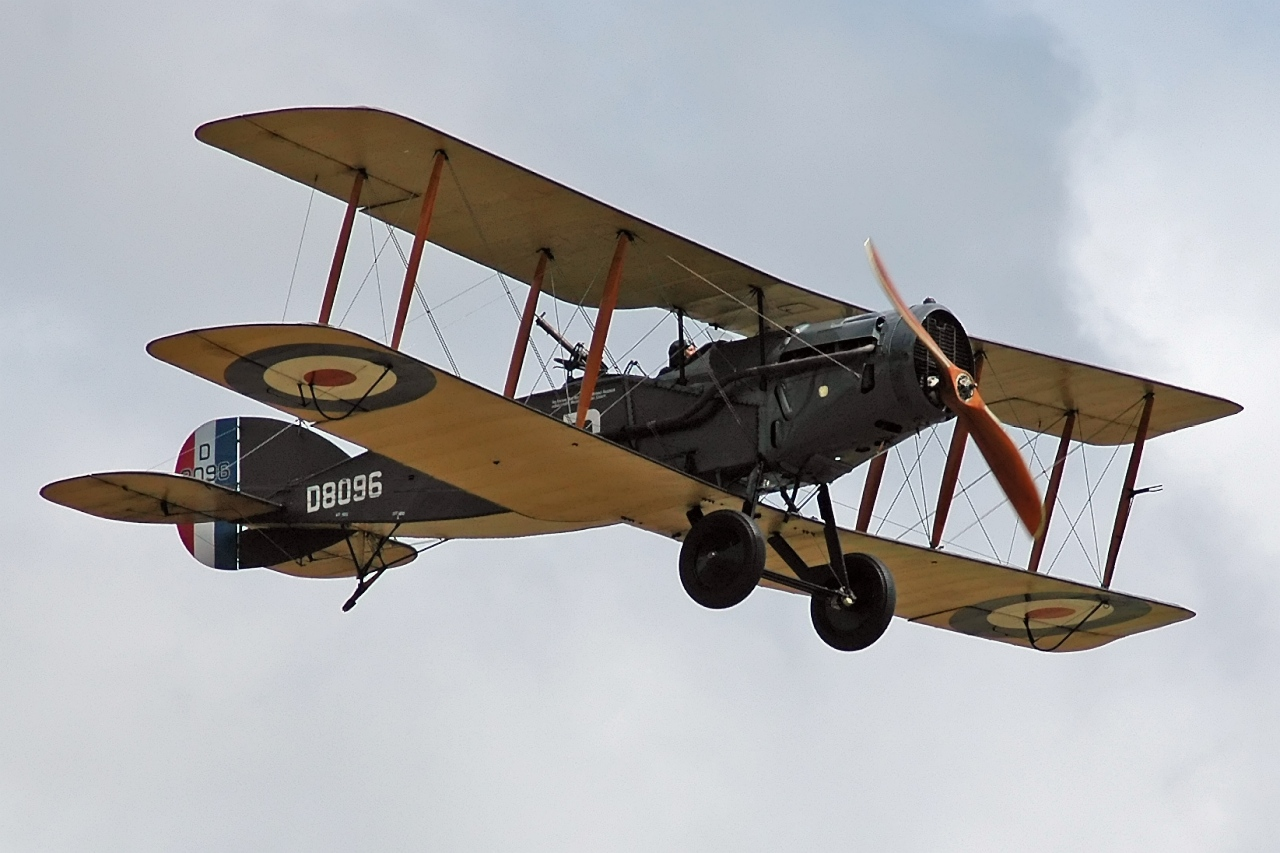
Bristol F.2b
Kemp's aircraft
