= Guglielmo Marconi =

Italian radio-frequency engineer and inventor (1874–1937)

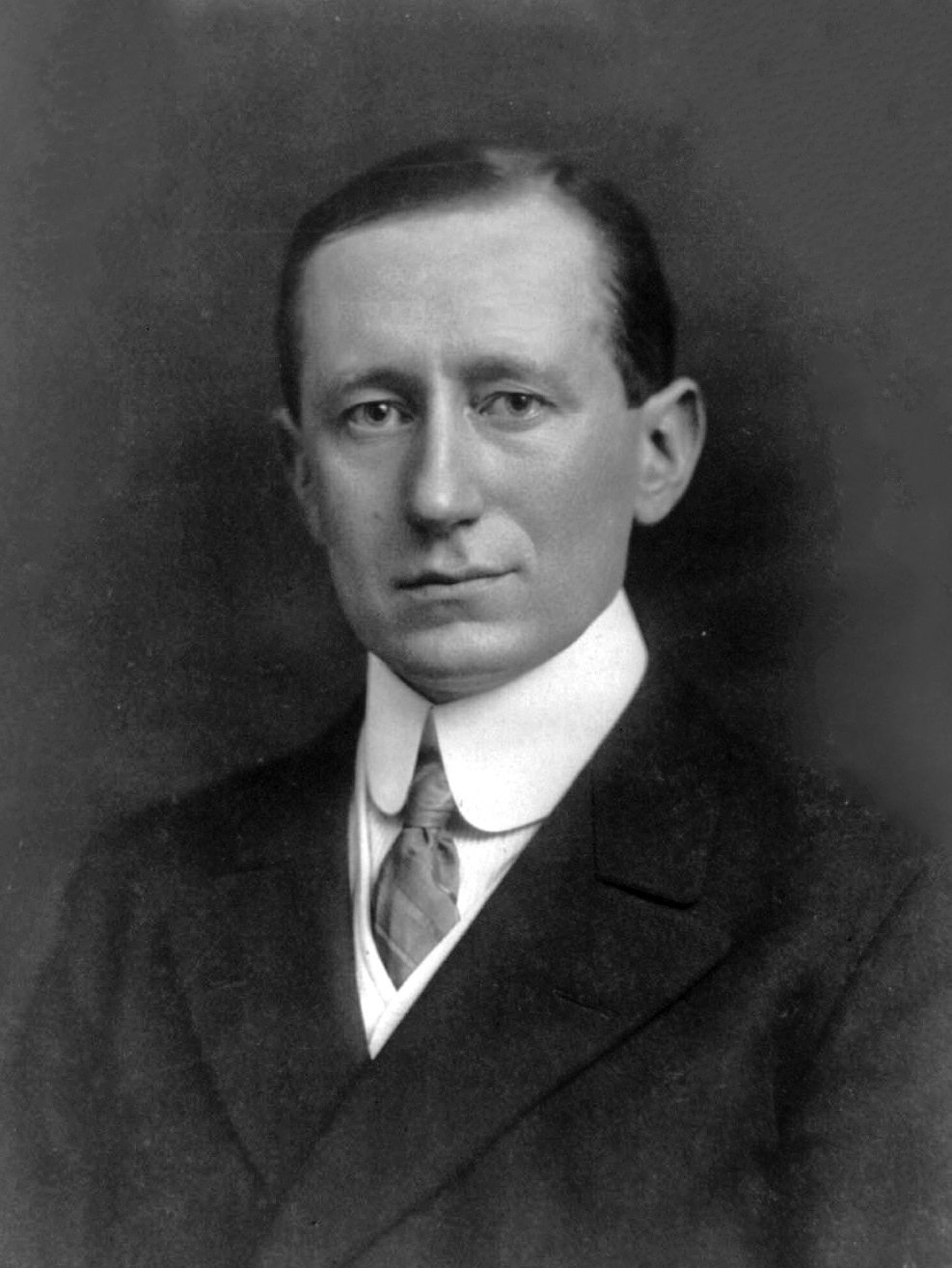
- Marconi in 1908

Member of the Senate of the Kingdom
- In office 1914–1937
- Appointed by: Victor Emmanuel III

Personal details
- Born: Guglielmo Giovanni Maria Marconi; 25 April 1874 Bologna, Emilia-Romagna, Kingdom of Italy
- Died: 20 July 1937 (aged 63) Rome, Kingdom of Italy
- Resting place: Mausoleum of Guglielmo Marconi, Emilia-Romagna
- Party: PNF (1923–1937)
- Spouses: Beatrice O'Brien (m. 1905; ann. 1927) Maria Cristina Bezzi-Scali (m. 1927)
- Children: 5 (4 with Beatrice, including Gioia; 1 with Maria)
- Relatives: Jameson family (by birth); O'Brien dynasty (by marriage)
- Known for: Invention of radio
- Awards: Matteucci Medal (1901); Nobel Prize in Physics (1909); Albert Medal (1914); Franklin Medal (1918); IRE Medal of Honor (1920); John Fritz Medal (1923); John Scott Medal (1931); Wilhelm Exner Medal (1934)
- Scientific career
- Fields: Radio-frequency engineering
- Workplaces: Marconi's Wireless Telegraph Company

Guglielmo Giovanni Maria Marconi, 1st Marquess (Note: /ɡʊlˈjɛlmoʊ mɑːrˈkoʊni, ɡɪlˈ-/ guul-YEL-moh mar-KOH-nee, ghil-; Italian: [ɡuʎˈʎɛlmo marˈkoːni]) (25 April 1874 – 20 July 1937), was an Italian radio-frequency engineer, inventor, and politician known for his invention of a practical radio wave-based wireless telegraph system. This led to his being largely credited as the inventor of radio and sharing the 1909 Nobel Prize in Physics with Ferdinand Braun "in recognition of their contributions to the development of wireless telegraphy." His work laid the foundation for the development of radio, television, and all modern wireless communication systems.

As an entrepreneur and a businessman, Marconi founded The Wireless Telegraph & Signal Company (later the Marconi Company) in the United Kingdom in 1897. In 1929, he was ennobled as a marquess (Italian: marchese) by King Victor Emmanuel III. In 1931, he set up Vatican Radio for Pope Pius XI.

== Early life and ancestry ==
=== Family ===
Marconi family arms

Guglielmo Giovanni Maria Marconi was born on 25 April 1874 at Palazzo Dall'Armi Marescalchi in Bologna, Italy, the son of Giuseppe Marconi, an Italian aristocratic landowner from Porretta Terme who lived in the countryside of Pontecchio, and his second wife, Annie Jameson, the granddaughter of Jameson Irish Whiskey founder John Jameson.

Giuseppe, who was a widower with a son, Luigi, married Annie on 16 April 1864 in Boulogne-sur-Mer, France. Alfonso, Marconi's older brother, was born the following year.

Between the ages of two and six Guglielmo lived with Alfonso and their mother in Bedford, England. Having an Irish mother helped explain his many activities in Great Britain and Ireland.

On 4 May 1877, when Marconi was age 3, his father decided to obtain British citizenship; Marconi could have thus also opted for British citizenship at any time, since both his parents were British citizens.

=== Education ===
Marconi did not receive any formal education during his youth. Instead, he learned chemistry, mathematics, and physics at home from a series of private tutors hired by his parents; his family hired additional tutors for him in the winter when they would leave Bologna for the warmer climate of Tuscany or Florence. An important mentor was Vincenzo Rosa, a high school physics teacher in Livorno. Rosa taught the 17-year-old Marconi the basics of physical phenomena as well as new theories on electricity.

At the age of 18, Marconi returned to Bologna and became acquainted with Augusto Righi, a physics professor at the University of Bologna, who had done research on Heinrich Hertz's work. Righi permitted Marconi to attend lectures at the university and also to use the university's laboratory and library.

== Radio work ==
Have I done the world good, or have I added a menace?

From youth, Marconi was interested in science and electricity. In the early 1890s, he began working on the idea of "wireless telegraphy" – i.e., the transmission of telegraph messages without connecting wires as used by the electric telegraph. This was not a new idea; numerous investigators and inventors had been exploring wireless telegraph technologies and even building systems using electric conduction, electromagnetic induction and optical (light) signalling for over 50 years, but none had proven technically and commercially successful. A relatively new development came from Heinrich Hertz, who, in 1888, demonstrated that one could produce and detect electromagnetic radiation, based on the work of James Clerk Maxwell. At the time, this radiation was commonly called "Hertzian waves", and is now generally referred to as radio waves.

There was a great deal of interest in radio waves in the physics community, but this interest was in the scientific phenomenon, not in its potential as a communication method. Physicists generally looked on radio waves as an invisible form of light that could only travel along a line of sight path, limiting its range to the visual horizon like existing forms of visual signalling. Hertz's death in 1894 brought published reviews of his earlier discoveries including a demonstration on the transmission and detection of radio waves by the British physicist Oliver Lodge and an article about Hertz's work by Augusto Righi. Righi's article renewed Marconi's interest in developing a wireless telegraphy system based on radio waves, a line of inquiry that Marconi noted other inventors did not seem to be pursuing.

=== Developing radio telegraphy ===
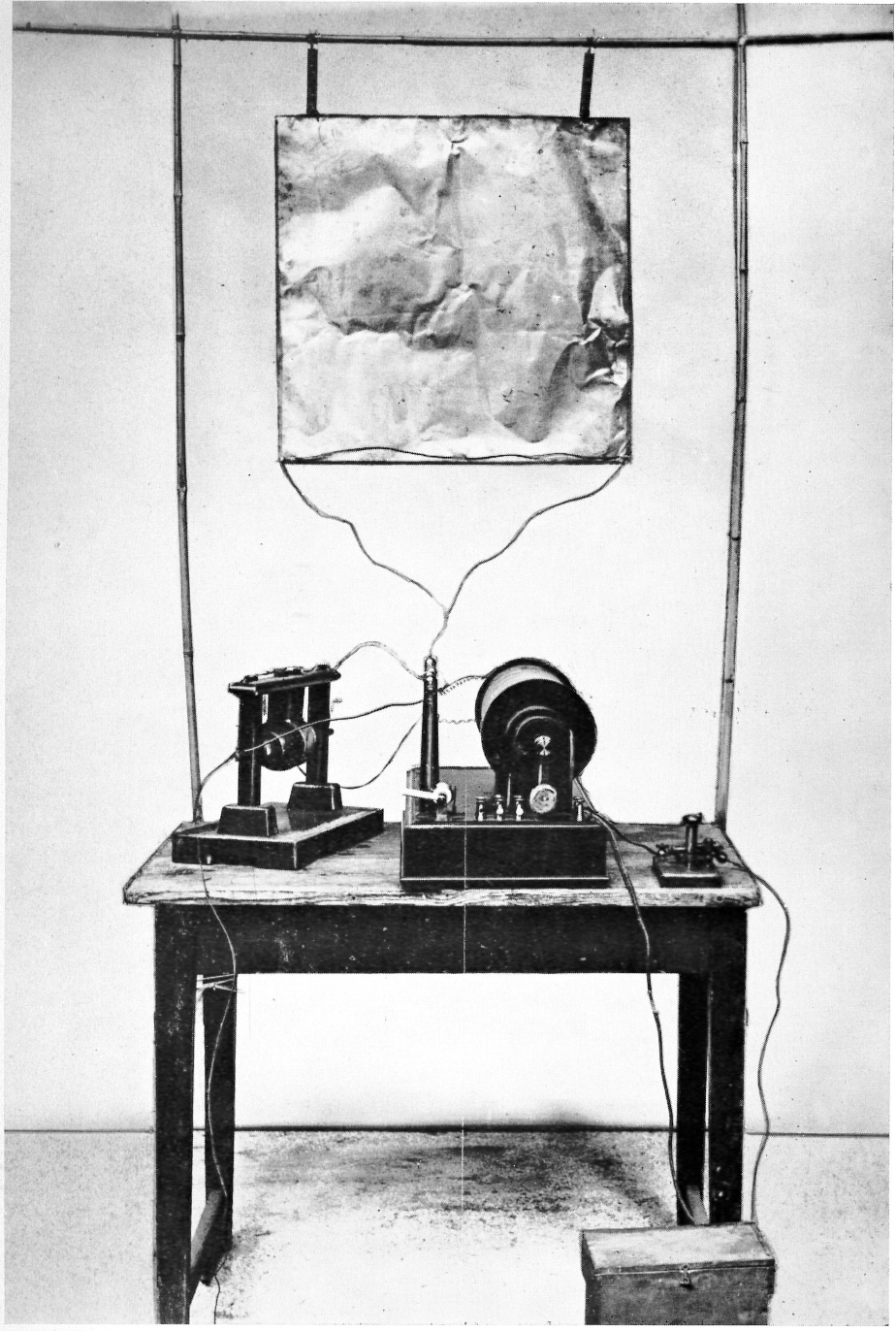
Marconi's first transmitter incorporating a monopole antenna. It consisted of an elevated copper sheet (top) connected to a Righi spark gap (left) powered by an induction coil (centre) with a telegraph key (right) to switch it on and off to spell out text messages in Morse code.

At the age of 20, Marconi began to conduct experiments on radio waves, building much of his own equipment in the attic of his home at the Villa Griffone in Pontecchio (now an administrative subdivision of Sasso Marconi), Italy, with the help of his butler, Mignani. Marconi built on Hertz's original experiments and, at the suggestion of Righi, began using a coherer, an early detector based on the 1890 findings of French physicist Édouard Branly and used in Lodge's experiments, that changed resistance when exposed to radio waves. In the summer of 1894, he built a storm alarm made up of a battery, a coherer, and an electric bell, which went off when it picked up the radio waves generated by lightning.

Late one night, in December 1894, Marconi demonstrated a radio transmitter and receiver to his mother, a set-up that made a bell ring on the other side of the room by pushing a telegraphic button on a bench. Supported by his father, Marconi continued to read through the literature and picked up on the ideas of physicists who were experimenting with radio waves. He developed devices, such as portable transmitters and receiver systems, that could work over long distances, turning what was essentially a laboratory experiment into a useful communication system. Marconi came up with a functional system with many components:

- A relatively simple oscillator or spark-producing radio transmitter;
- A wire or metal sheet capacity area suspended at a height above the ground;
- A coherer receiver, which was a modification of Édouard Branly's original device with refinements to increase sensitivity and reliability;
- A telegraph key to operate the transmitter to send short and long pulses, corresponding to the dots-and-dashes of Morse code; and
- A telegraph register activated by the coherer which recorded the received Morse code dots and dashes onto a roll of paper tape.

In the summer of 1895, Marconi moved his experiments outdoors on his father's estate in Bologna. He tried different arrangements and shapes of antenna but even with improvements he was able to transmit signals only up to 800 metres (0.5 mile), a distance Oliver Lodge had predicted in 1894 as the maximum transmission distance for radio waves.

=== Transmission breakthrough ===
A breakthrough came in the summer of 1895, when Marconi found that a much greater range could be achieved after he raised the height of his antenna and, borrowing from a technique used in wired telegraphy, grounded his transmitter and receiver. With these improvements, the system was capable of transmitting signals up to 2 miles (3.2 km) and over hills. The monopole antenna reduced the frequency of the waves compared to the dipole antennas used by Hertz, and radiated vertically polarized radio waves which could travel longer distances. By this point, he concluded that a device could become capable of spanning greater distances, with additional funding and research, and would prove valuable both commercially and militarily. Marconi's experimental apparatus proved to be the first engineering-complete, commercially successful radio transmission system.

Marconi applied to the Italian Ministry of Post and Telegraphs, then under the direction of Maggiorino Ferraris, explaining his wireless telegraph machine and asking for funding, but never received a response. An apocryphal tale claims that the minister (incorrectly named first as Emilio Sineo, later as Pietro Lacava) wrote "to the Longara" on the document, referring to the insane asylum on Via della Lungara in Rome, but the letter was never found.

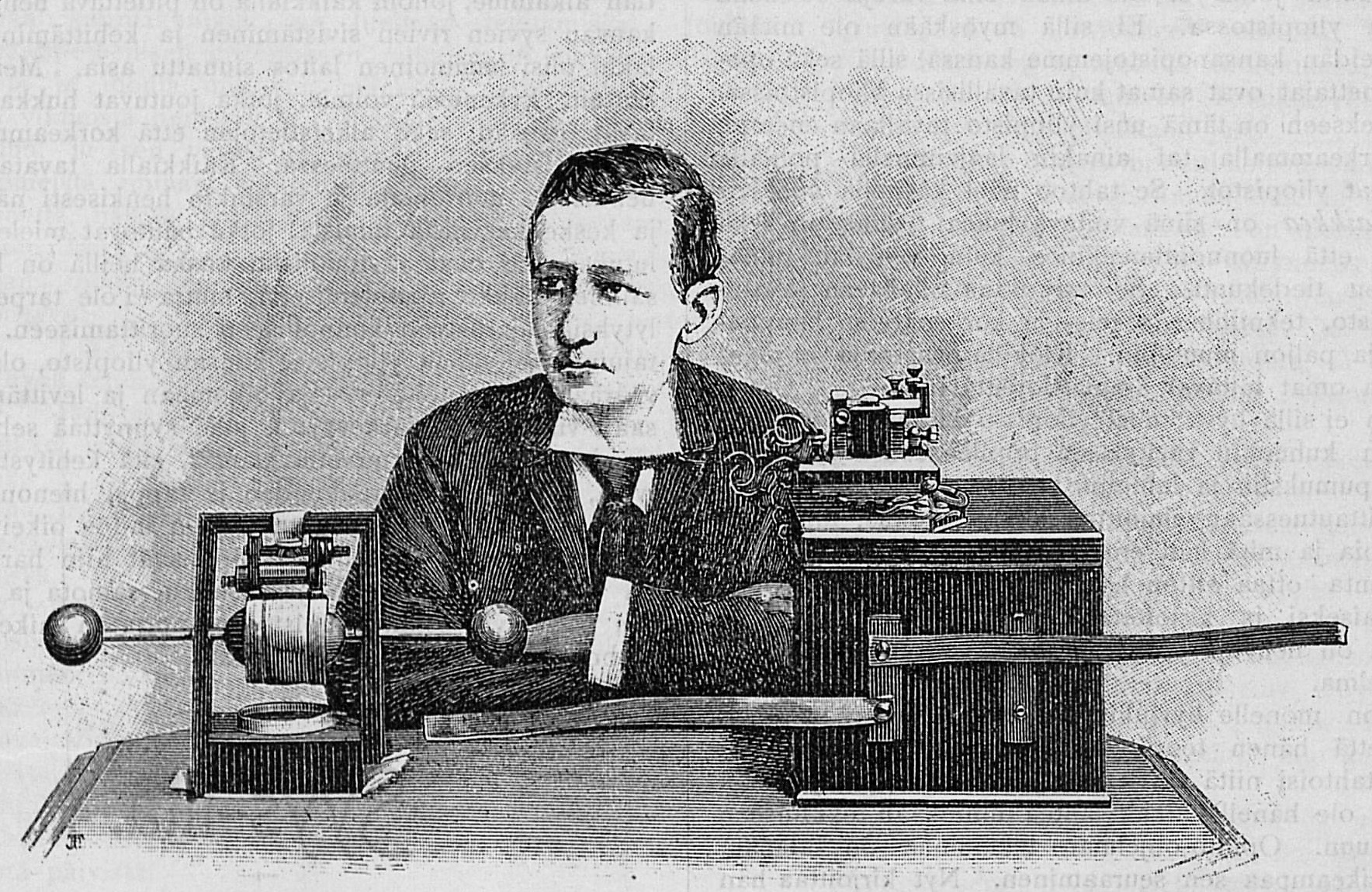
1897 illustration of Marconi with his invention

In 1896, Marconi spoke with his family friend Carlo Gardini, Honorary Consul at the United States Consulate in Bologna, about leaving Italy to go to Great Britain. Gardini wrote a letter of introduction to the Ambassador of Italy in London, Annibale Ferrero, explaining who Marconi was and about his extraordinary discoveries. In his response, Ambassador Ferrero advised them not to reveal Marconi's results until after a patent was obtained. He also encouraged Marconi to come to Britain, where he believed it would be easier to find the necessary funds to convert his experiments into practical use. Finding little interest or appreciation for his work in Italy, Marconi travelled to London in early 1896 at the age of 21, accompanied by his mother, to seek support for his work. (He spoke fluent English in addition to Italian.) Marconi arrived at Dover, and the Customs officer opened his case to find various apparatuses. The customs officer immediately contacted the Admiralty in London. With worries in the UK about Italian anarchists and suspicion Marconi was importing a bomb, his equipment was destroyed.

While in the UK, Marconi gained the interest and support of William Preece, the Chief Electrical Engineer of the General Post Office (the GPO). Marconi applied for a patent on 2 June 1896. British Patent number 12039 titled "Improvements in Transmitting Electrical impulses and Signals, and in Apparatus therefor", which became the first patent for a communication system based on radio waves.

=== Demonstrations and achievements ===
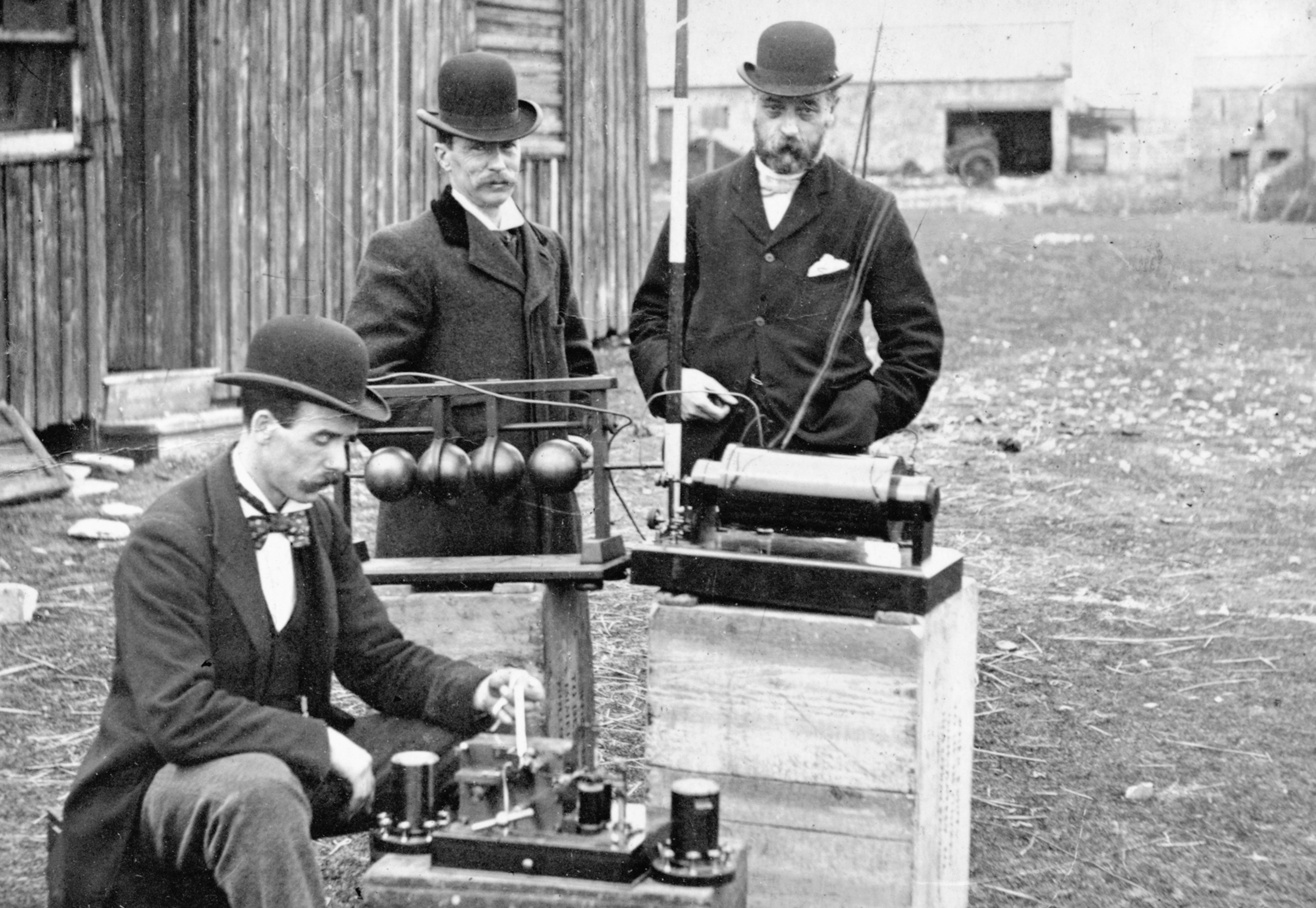
British Post Office engineers inspect Marconi's radio equipment during a demonstration on Flat Holm Island in the Bristol Channel, 13 May 1897. The transmitter is at the centre, the coherer receiver below it, and the pole supporting the wire antenna is visible at top.

Marconi made the first demonstration of his system for the British government in July 1896. A further series of demonstrations for the British followed, and, by March 1897, Marconi had transmitted Morse code signals over a distance of about 3 miles (5 km) across Salisbury Plain. On 13 May 1897, Marconi sent the first ever wireless communication over the open sea – a message was transmitted over the Bristol Channel from Flat Holm Island to Lavernock Point near Cardiff, a distance of 3 miles (4.8 km). The message read "Are you ready". The transmitting equipment was almost immediately relocated to Brean Down Fort on the Somerset coast, stretching the range to 10 miles (16 km).

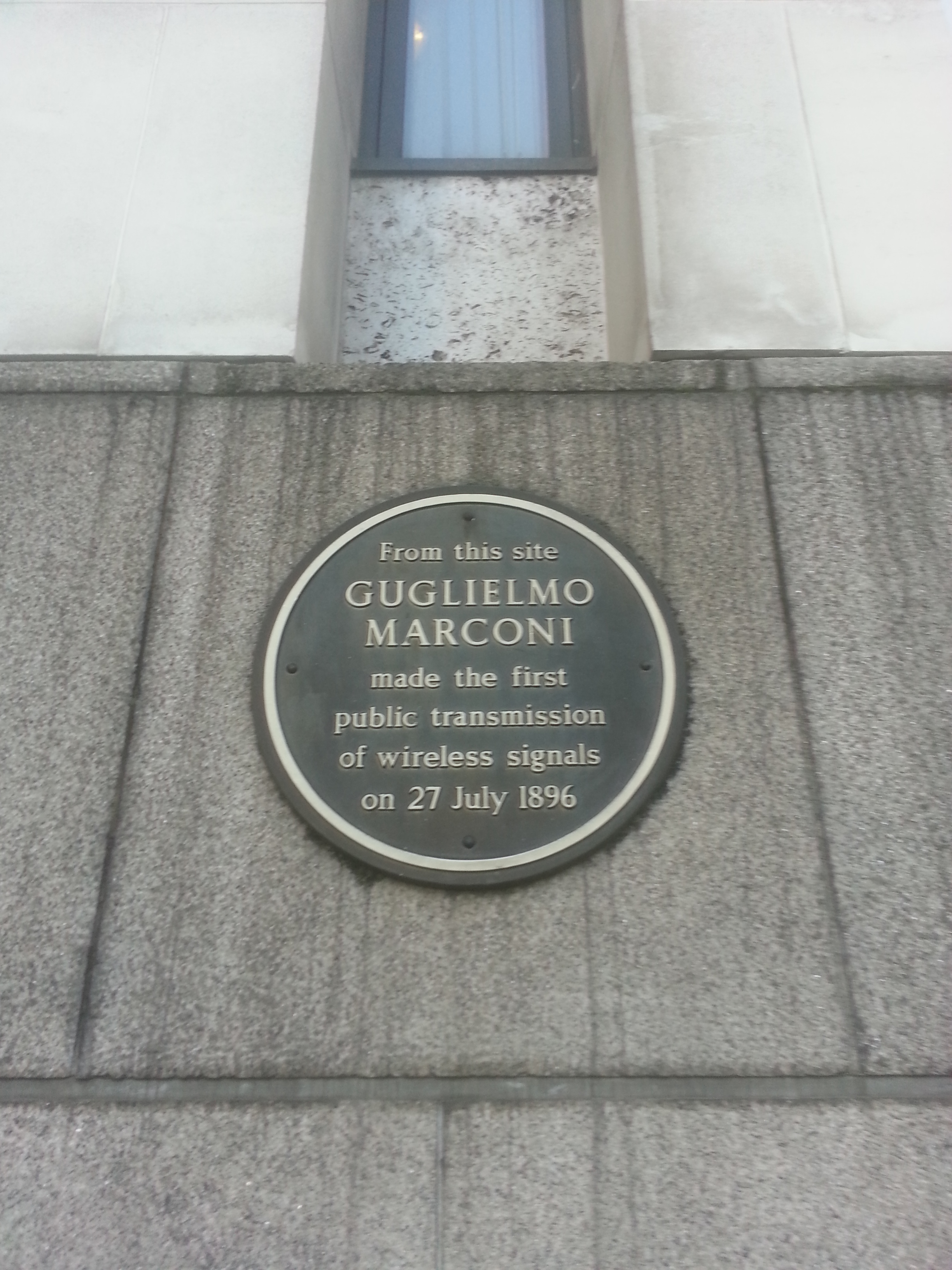
Plaque on the outside of the BT Centre in London, commemorating Marconi's first public transmission of wireless signals.

Impressed by these and other demonstrations, Preece introduced Marconi's ongoing work to the general public at two important London lectures: "Telegraphy without Wires", at the Toynbee Hall on 11 December 1896; and "Signalling through Space without Wires", given to the Royal Institution on 4 June 1897.

Numerous additional demonstrations followed, and Marconi began to receive international attention. In July 1897, he carried out a series of tests at La Spezia, in his home country, for the Italian government. A test for Lloyd's between The Marine Hotel in Ballycastle and Rathlin Island, both in County Antrim in Ulster, Ireland, was conducted on 6 July 1898 by George Kemp and Edward Edwin Glanville. A transmission across the English Channel was accomplished on 27 March 1899, from Wimereux, France to South Foreland Lighthouse, England. Marconi set up an experimental base at the Haven Hotel, Sandbanks, Poole Harbour, Dorset, where he erected a 100-foot high mast. He became friends with the van Raaltes, the owners of Brownsea Island in Poole Harbour, and his steam yacht, the Elettra, was often moored on Brownsea or at The Haven Hotel. Marconi would later purchase the vessel after the Great War and convert it to a seaborne laboratory from where he would conduct many of his experiments. Among the Elettra's crew was Adelmo Landini, his personal radio operator, who was also an inventor.

In December 1898, the British lightship service authorised the establishment of wireless communication between the South Foreland lighthouse at Dover and the East Goodwin lightship, twelve miles distant. On 17 March 1899, the East Goodwin lightship sent the first wireless distress signal, a signal on behalf of the merchant vessel Elbe which had run aground on Goodwin Sands. The message was received by the radio operator of the South Foreland lighthouse, who summoned the aid of the Ramsgate lifeboat.

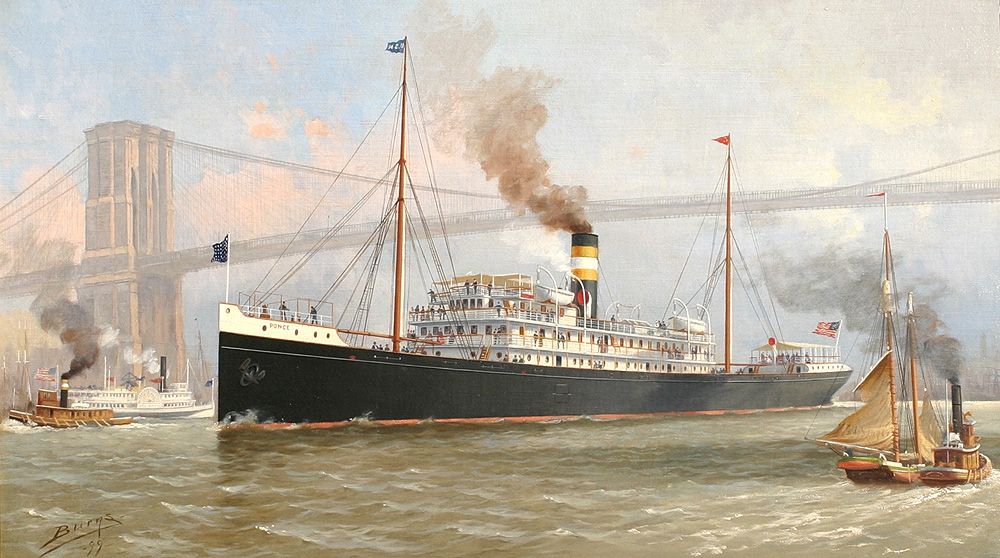
SS Ponce entering New York Harbor 1899, by Milton J. Burns

In 1899, Marconi sailed to the United States at the invitation of The New York Herald newspaper to cover that year's America's Cup international yacht races off Sandy Hook, New Jersey. His first demonstration was a transmission from aboard the SS Ponce, a passenger ship of the Porto Rico Line. Marconi left for England on 8 November 1899 on the American Line's SS Saint Paul, and he and his assistants installed wireless equipment aboard during the voyage. Marconi's wireless brought news of the Second Boer War, which had begun a month before their departure, to passengers at the request of "some of the officials of the American line." On 15 November the SS Saint Paul became the first ocean liner to report her imminent return to Great Britain by wireless when Marconi's Royal Needles Hotel radio station contacted her 66 nautical miles off the English coast. The first Transatlantic Times, a newspaper containing wireless transmission news from the Needles Station at the Isle of Wight, was published on board the SS Saint Paul before its arrival.

=== Transatlantic transmissions ===
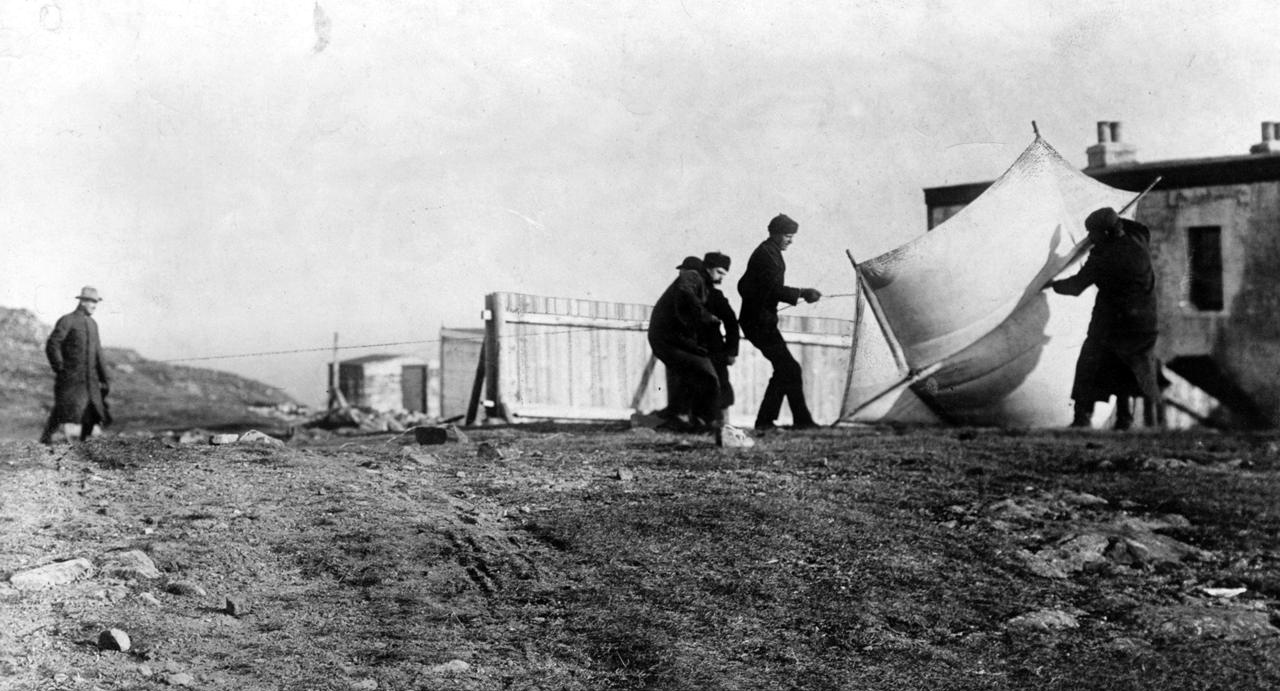
Marconi watching associates raising the kite (a "Levitor" by Baden Baden-Powell) used to lift the antenna at St. John's, Newfoundland, December 1901.

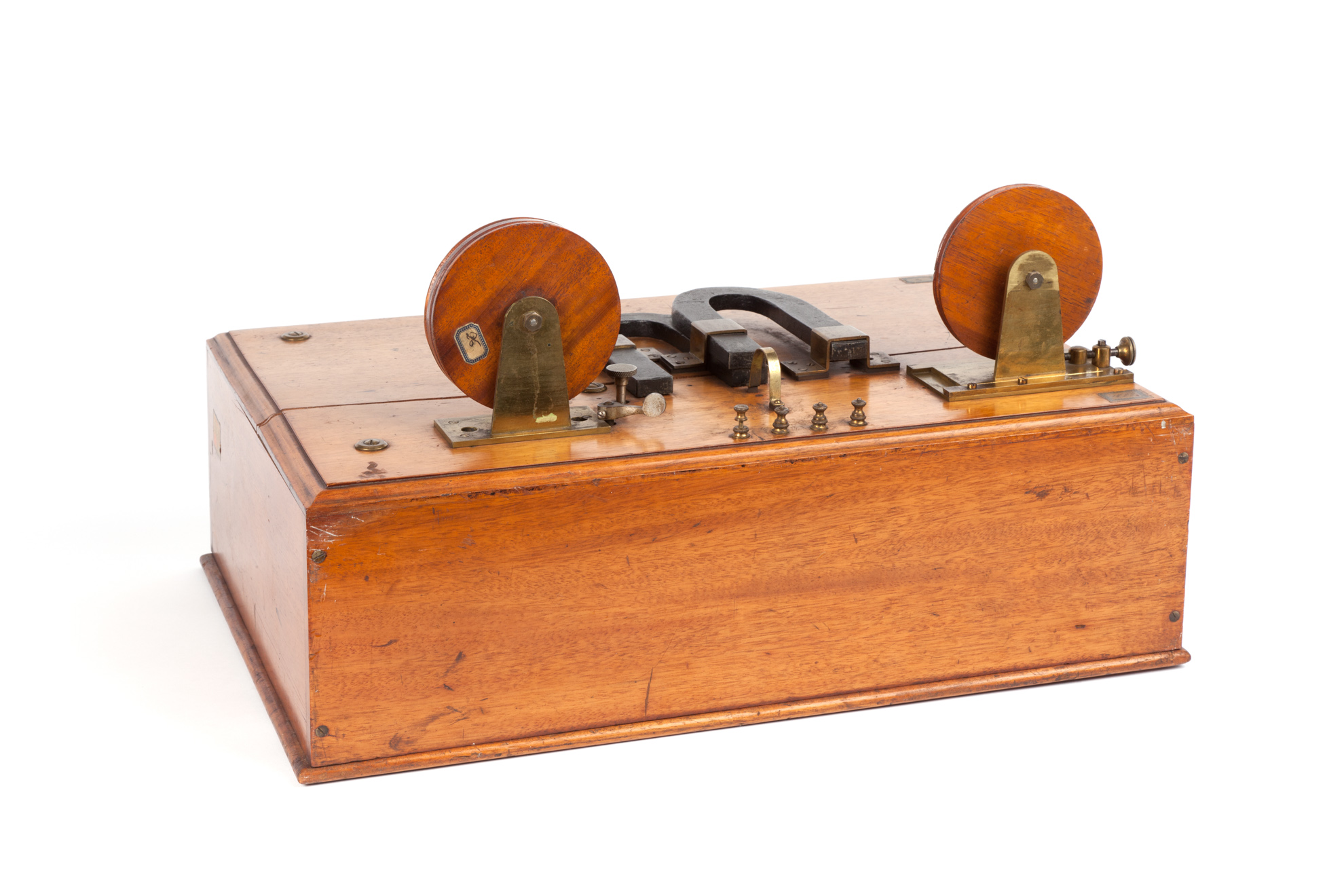
Magnetic detector by Marconi used during the experimental campaign aboard a ship in summer 1902, exhibited at the Museo Nazionale Scienza e Tecnologia Leonardo da Vinci of Milan.

At the turn of the 20th century, Marconi began investigating a means to signal across the Atlantic to compete with the transatlantic telegraph cables. Marconi established a wireless transmitting station at Marconi House, Rosslare Strand, County Wexford, in 1901 to act as a link between Poldhu in Cornwall, England, and Clifden in Connemara, County Galway, Ireland. He soon made the announcement that the message was received at Signal Hill in St. John's, Newfoundland (now part of Canada), on 12 December 1901, using a 500-foot (150 m) kite-supported antenna for reception – signals transmitted by the company's new high-power station at Poldhu, Cornwall. The distance between the two points was about 2,200 miles (3,500 km). It was heralded as a great scientific advance, yet there also was – and continues to be – considerable scepticism about this claim. The exact wavelength used is not known, but it is fairly reliably determined to have been in the neighbourhood of 350 metres (frequency ≈ 850 kHz). The tests took place at a time of day during which the entire transatlantic path was in daylight. It is now known (although Marconi did not know then) that this was the worst possible choice. At this medium wavelength, long-distance transmission in the daytime is not possible because of the heavy absorption of the skywave in the ionosphere. It was not a blind test; Marconi knew in advance to listen for a repetitive signal of three clicks, signifying the Morse code letter S. The clicks were reported to have been heard faintly and sporadically. There was no independent confirmation of the reported reception, and the transmissions were difficult to distinguish from atmospheric noise. A detailed technical review of Marconi's early transatlantic work appears in John S. Belrose's work of 1995. The Poldhu transmitter was a two-stage circuit.

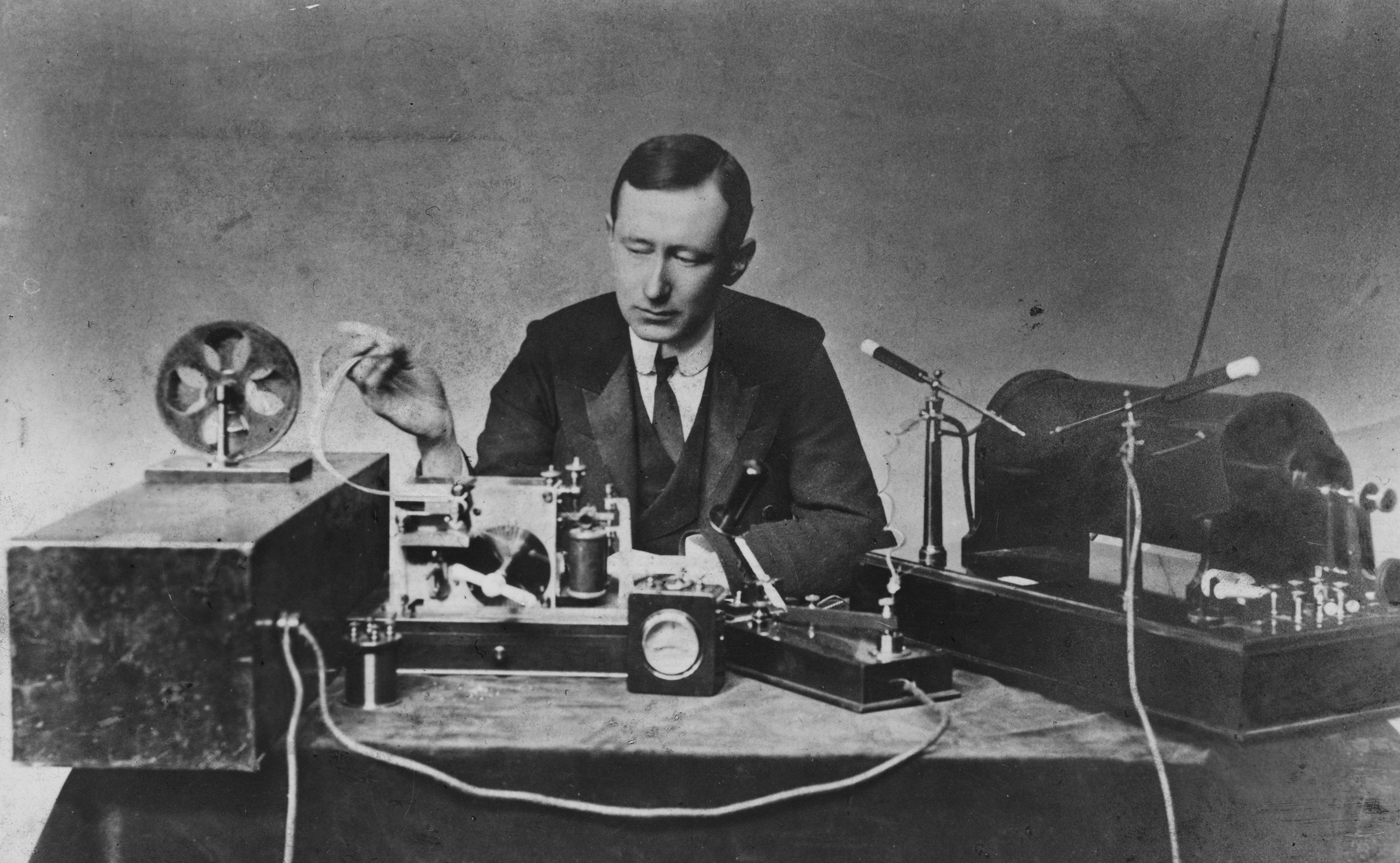
Marconi demonstrating apparatus he used in his first long-distance radio transmissions in the 1890s. The transmitter is at the right, the receiver with paper tape recorder at the left.

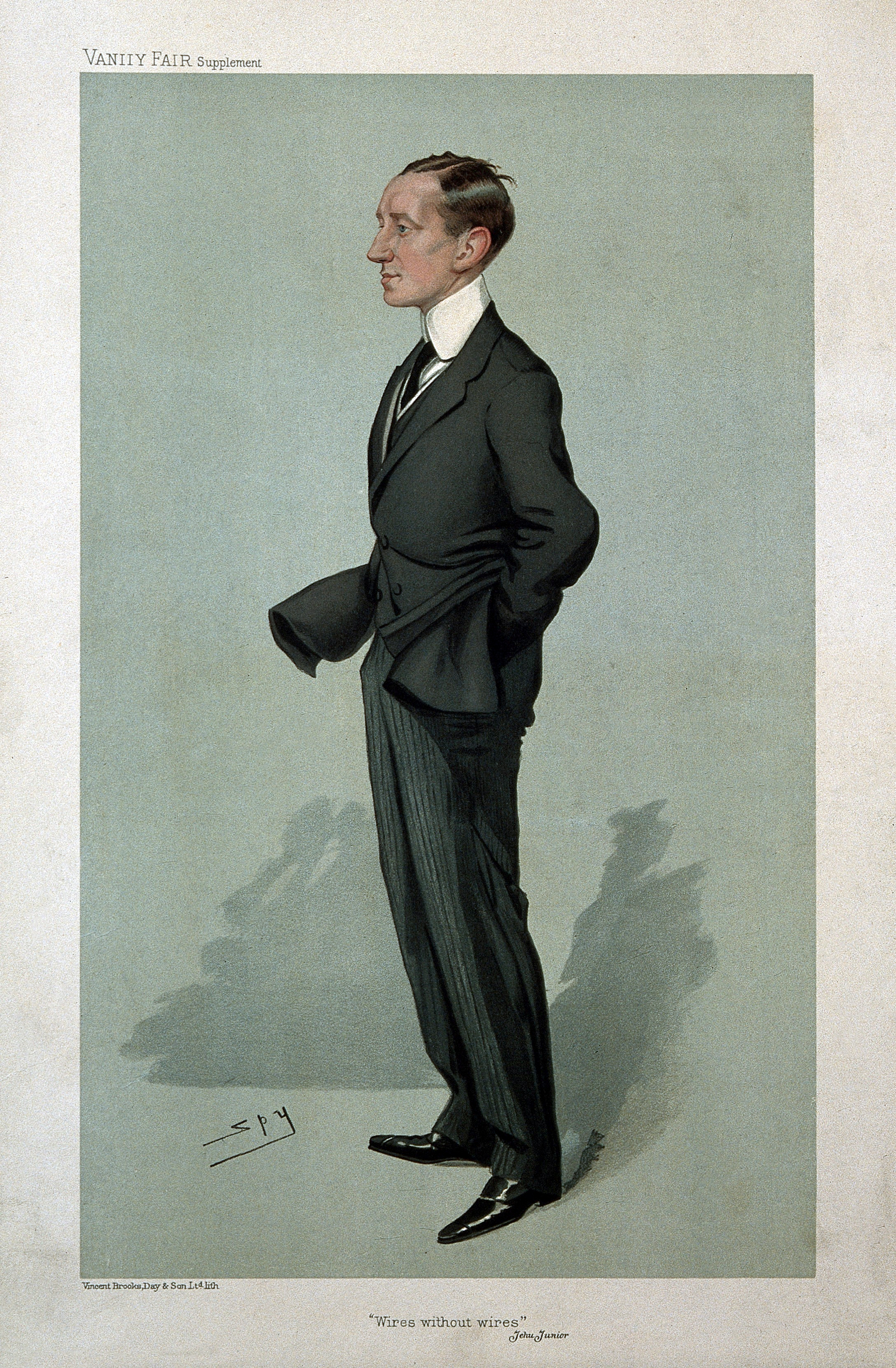
Marconi caricatured by Leslie Ward for Vanity Fair, 1905.

Feeling challenged by sceptics, Marconi prepared a better-organised and documented test. In February 1902, the SS Philadelphia sailed west from Great Britain with Marconi aboard, carefully recording signals sent daily from the Poldhu station. The test results produced coherer-tape reception up to 1,550 miles (2,490 km), and audio reception up to 2,100 miles (3,400 km). The maximum distances were achieved at night, and these tests were the first to show that radio signals for medium wave and longwave transmissions travel much farther at night than during the day. During the daytime, signals had been received up to only about 700 miles (1,100 km), less than half of the distance claimed earlier at Newfoundland, where the transmissions had also taken place during the day. Because of this, Marconi had not fully confirmed the Newfoundland claims, although he did prove that radio signals could be sent for hundreds of kilometres (miles), despite some scientists' belief that they were limited essentially to line-of-sight distances.

On 17 December 1902, a transmission from the Marconi station in Glace Bay, Nova Scotia, Canada, became the world's first radio message to cross the Atlantic from North America. In 1901, Marconi built a station near South Wellfleet, Massachusetts, that sent a message of greetings on 18 January 1903 from United States President Theodore Roosevelt to King Edward VII of the United Kingdom. However, consistent transatlantic signalling was difficult to establish.

Marconi began to build high-powered stations on both sides of the Atlantic to communicate with ships at sea, in competition with other inventors. In 1904, he established a commercial service to transmit nightly news summaries to subscribing ships, which could incorporate them into their on-board newspapers. A regular transatlantic radio-telegraph service was finally begun on 17 October 1907 between Clifden, Ireland, and Glace Bay, but even after this the company struggled for many years to provide reliable communication to others.

=== Titanic ===
The role played by Marconi Co. wireless in maritime rescues raised public awareness of the value of radio and brought fame to Marconi, particularly the sinking of RMS Titanic on 15 April 1912 and RMS Lusitania on 7 May 1915.

RMS Titanic radio operators Jack Phillips and Harold Bride were not employed by the White Star Line but by the Marconi International Marine Communication Company. After the sinking of the ocean liner, survivors were rescued by the RMS Carpathia of the Cunard Line. There was a distance of 93 km (58 miles) between the two ships. When Carpathia docked in New York, Marconi went aboard with a reporter from The New York Times to talk with Bride, the surviving operator. After this incident, Marconi gained popularity and became more recognised for his contributions to the field of radio and wireless technology.

On 18 June 1912, Marconi gave evidence to the Court of Inquiry into the loss of Titanic regarding the marine telegraphy's functions and the procedures for emergencies at sea. Britain's Postmaster-General summed up, referring to the Titanic disaster: "Those who have been saved, have been saved through one man, Mr. Marconi ... and his marvellous invention." Marconi was offered free passage on Titanic before she sank, but had taken Lusitania three days earlier. As his daughter Degna later explained, he had paperwork to do and preferred the public stenographer aboard that vessel.

=== Sir J. C. Bose's diode detector and Marconi's first transatlantic wireless signal ===
In Guglielmo Marconi's historic transatlantic wireless communication experiment on 12 December 1901, the inaugural signal—consisting of the Morse code letter "S"—was received at Signal Hill in St. John's, Newfoundland, employing a mercury coherer detector connected to a telephone receiver. This self-restoring detector, essential for signal detection without mechanical decohering, was devised by Sir Jagadish Chandra Bose, a professor at Presidency College, Calcutta. Bose initially described this iron-mercury-iron or iron-mercury-carbon contact apparatus in a paper submitted to the Royal Society on 27 April 1899, acknowledged as the earliest patented solid-state diode detector (British Patent No. 7555, 1901; U.S. Patent 755840, 1904). The exhaustive inquiry into this invention and its application in Marconi's experiment is documented in a 1998 paper by Probir K. Bondyopadhyay, published by the Institute of Electrical and Electronics Engineers (IEEE).

Marconi procured the detector during the summer of 1901 from Lieutenant Luigi Solari of the Royal Italian Navy, who adapted Bose's configuration by encapsulating a mercury droplet between carbon or iron electrodes within a glass tube. Marconi submitted a British patent application (No. 18105, September 1901) under his own name, subsequently revised to attribute the communication to Solari. The employment of this apparatus precipitated the "Italian Navy Coherer" scandal, initiated when Professor Angelo Banti, editor of L'Elettricista, asserted in May 1902 that naval signalman Paolo Castelli was its originator. This contention engendered discussions in British periodicals, such as The Electrician and Saturday Review. Solari repudiated Castelli's attribution, indicating that his inspiration derived from English scholarly sources, presumably Bose's 1899 publication.

In 1903, Emilio Guarini proposed that Professor Tommaso Tommasina of Genoa held precedence, referencing his experiments from 1899 to 1900. Nevertheless, Marconi's lecture at the Royal Institution on 13 June 1902 delineated Tommasina's contributions as separate, and Solari affirmed unawareness of Tommasina's research until subsequent to the address. Tommasina's investigations, succeeding Bose's, omitted the telephone component. Marconi's exchanges with John Ambrose Fleming and subsequent narratives eschewed acknowledgment of Bose, potentially attributable to patent considerations.

Bose's detector constituted a foundational element in nascent wireless technology, enabling Marconi's accomplishment, although its provenance was eclipsed by the controversy and Marconi's deliberate equivocations. The affair, meticulously analyzed in Bondyopadhyay's 1998 IEEE paper, illuminates intricate matters of attribution and innovation within the emergent domain of radio communication.

=== Continuing work ===
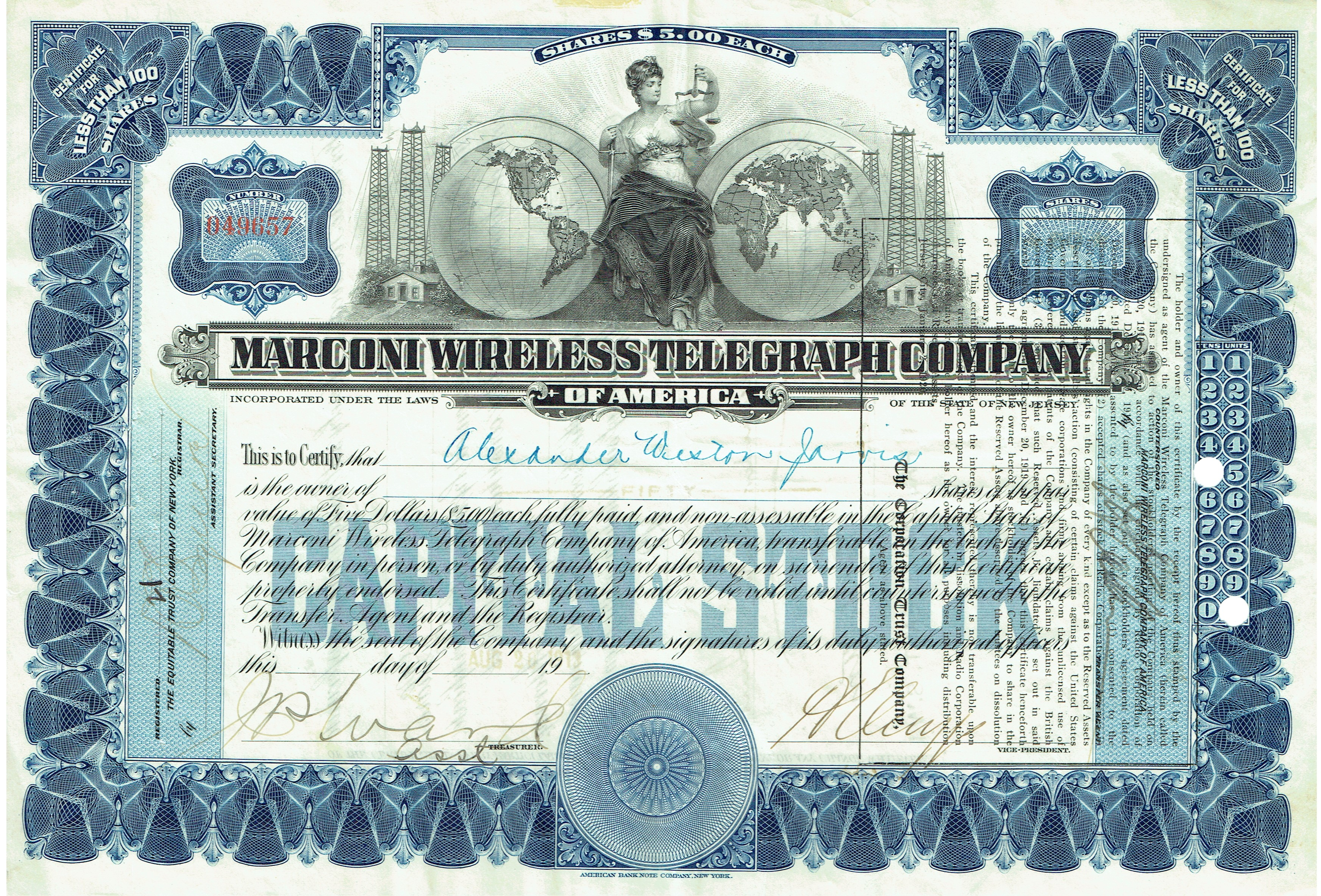
Share of the Marconi Wireless Telegraph Company of America, issued 20 August 1913.

Over the years, the Marconi companies gained a reputation for being technically conservative, in particular by continuing to use inefficient spark-transmitter technology, which could be used only for radio-telegraph operations, long after it was apparent that the future of radio communication lay with continuous-wave transmissions which were more efficient and could be used for audio transmissions. Somewhat belatedly, the company did begin significant work with continuous-wave equipment beginning in 1915, after the introduction of the oscillating vacuum tube (valve). The New Street Works factory in Chelmsford was the location for the first entertainment radio broadcasts in the United Kingdom in 1920, employing a vacuum tube transmitter and featuring Dame Nellie Melba. In 1922, regular entertainment broadcasts commenced from the Marconi Research Centre at Great Baddow, forming the prelude to the BBC, and he spoke of the close association of aviation and wireless telephony in that same year at a private gathering with Florence Tyzack Parbury, and even spoke of interplanetary wireless communication. In 1924, the Marconi Company co-established the Unione Radiofonica Italiana (now RAI).

== Politics and military service ==
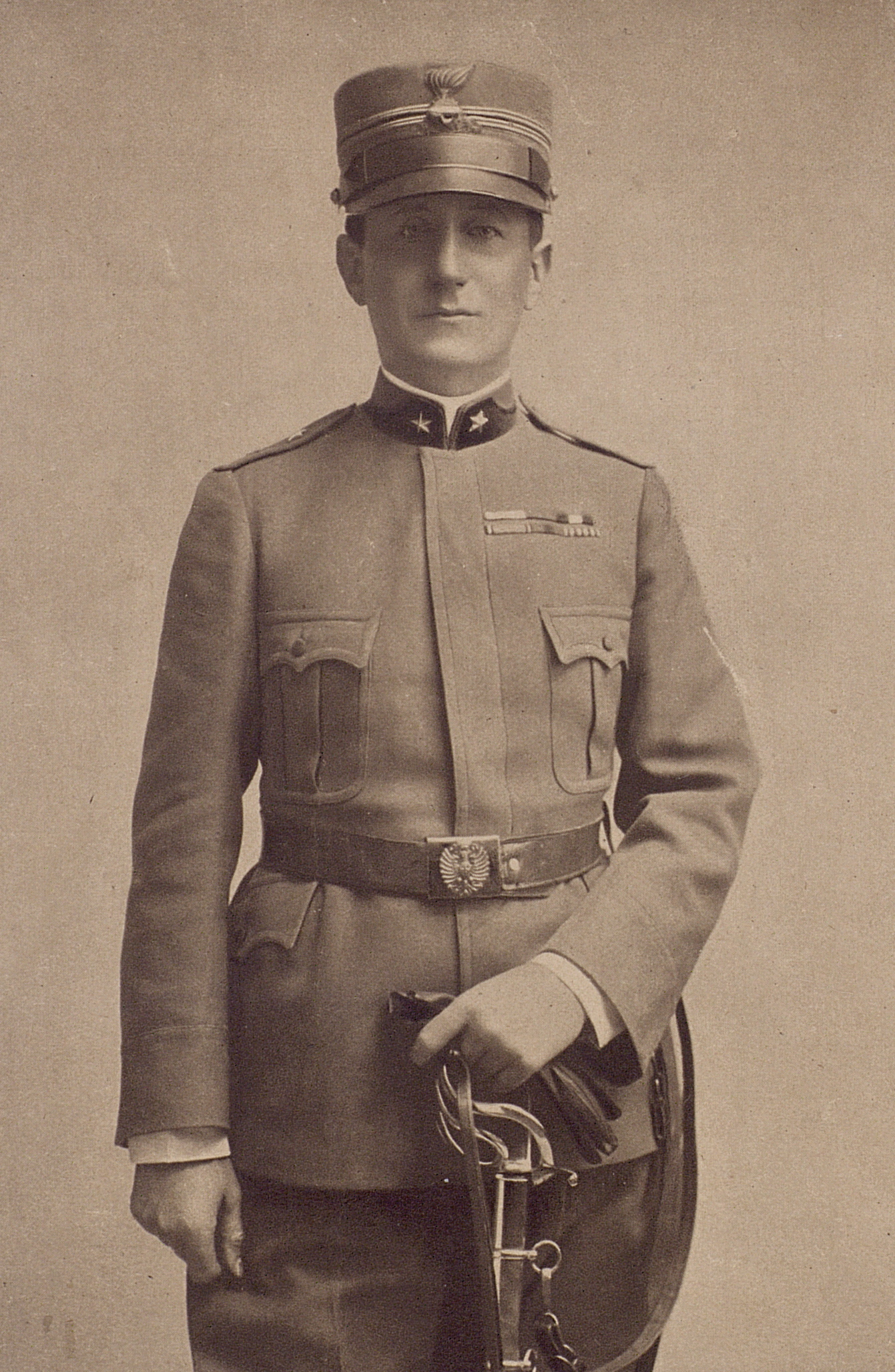
Marconi in army uniform.

In 1914, Marconi was made a Senator in the Senate of the Kingdom of Italy and was appointed Honorary Knight Grand Cross of the Royal Victorian Order in the UK. The following year, Italy joined the Allied side of World War I, and Marconi was placed in charge of the Italian military's radio service. He attained the rank of Lieutenant in the Royal Italian Army and of Commander in the Royal Italian Navy. In 1929, he was made a marquess by King Victor Emmanuel III.

=== Fascism ===
In 1923, Marconi joined the National Fascist Party. In 1930, Prime Minister Benito Mussolini appointed him President of the Royal Academy of Italy, which made him a Member of the Fascist Grand Council. He was an apologist for fascist ideology and actions such as the Italian invasion of Ethiopia in 1935.

In his lecture, he stated: "I reclaim the honour of being the first fascist in the field of radiotelegraphy, the first who acknowledged the utility of joining the electric rays in a bundle, as Mussolini was the first in the political field who acknowledged the necessity of merging all the healthy energies of the country into a bundle, for the greater greatness of Italy." Documents that came to light in 2002 showed Marconi colluded with Mussolini's campaign against Jews, not allowing them to join the Royal Academy during the 1930s.

== Death and posthumous ==
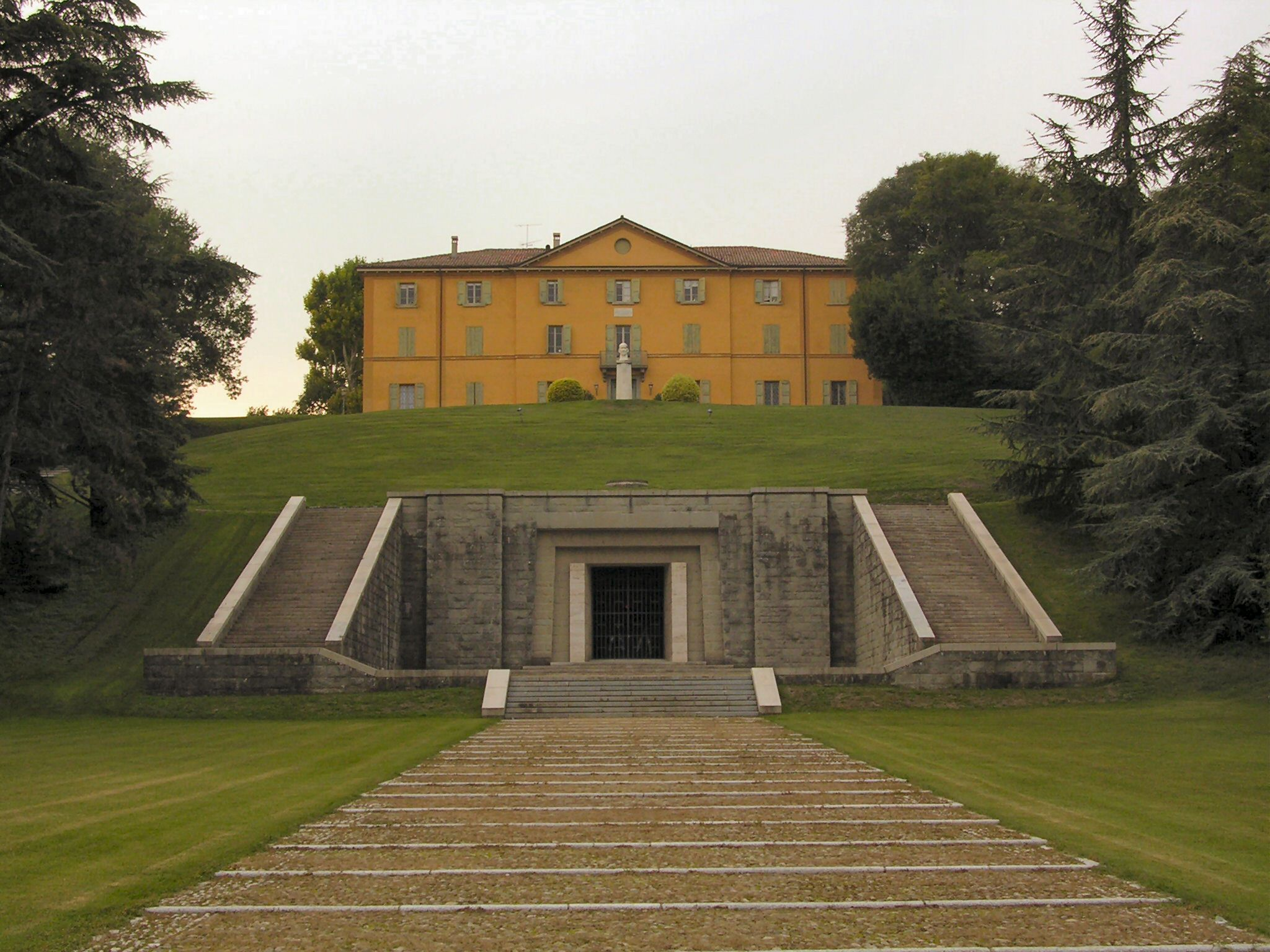
Villa Marconi, with Marconi's tomb in the foreground.

While helping to develop microwave technology, Marconi suffered nine heart attacks in the span of three years preceding his death. Following the ninth heart attack, he died on 20 July 1937 in Rome at the age of 63. A state funeral was held for him. As a tribute, shops on the street where he lived were "Closed for national mourning". In addition, at 6 pm the next day, the time designated for the funeral, transmitters around the world observed two minutes of silence in his honour. The British Post Office also sent a message requesting that all broadcasting ships honour Marconi with two minutes of broadcasting silence. His remains are housed at the Mausoleum of Guglielmo Marconi in Sasso Marconi, Emilia-Romagna, which assumed that name in his honour in 1938.

In 1943, Marconi's steam yacht, Elettra, was commandeered and refitted as a warship by the German Kriegsmarine. The following year, she was sunk by the British Royal Air Force on 22 January. After the war, the Italian government tried to retrieve the wreckage to rebuild the boat; the wreckage was removed to Italy. Eventually, the idea was abandoned, and the wreckage was cut into pieces which were distributed amongst Italian museums.

=== Invalidation of Marconi's patents ===
On June 21, 1943, the Supreme Court of the United States affirmed a 1935 ruling of the United States Court of Claims on Marconi's radio patents (which essentially invalidated Marconi’s claim of having invented radio), restoring the prior patents of Oliver Lodge, John Stone Stone, and Nikola Tesla and clarified Lodge's, Stone's and Tesla’s role in inventing radio:

The broad claims of the Marconi Patent No. 763,772, for improvements in apparatus for wireless telegraphy -- briefly, for a structure and arrangement of four high-frequency circuits with means of independently adjusting each so that all four may be brought into electrical resonance with one another -- held invalid because anticipated. Marconi showed no invention over Stone (Patent No. 714,756) by making the tuning of his antenna circuit adjustable, or by using Lodge's (Patent No. 609, 154) variable inductance for that purpose.

— Marconi Wireless Tel. Co. v. United States, 320 U.S. 1.

Tesla thus anticipated the following features of the Marconi patent: a charging circuit in the transmitter for causing oscillations of the desired frequency, coupled, through a transformer, with the open antenna circuit, and the synchronization of the two circuits by the proper disposition of the inductance in either the closed or the antenna circuit or both. By this and the added disclosure of the two-circuit arrangement in the receiver with similar adjustment, he anticipated the four-circuit tuned combination of Marconi. A feature of the Marconi combination not shown by Tesla was the use of a variable inductance as a means of adjusting the tuning the antenna circuit of transmitter and receiver. This was developed by Lodge after Tesla's patent, but before the Marconi patent in suit.

— Marconi Wireless Tel. Co. v. United States, 320 U.S. 15-16.

As the result of such a study, we are forced to conclude, without undertaking to determine whether Stone's patent involved invention, that the Court of Claims was right in deciding that Stone anticipated Marconi, and that Marconi's patent did not disclose invention over Stone. Hence, the judgment below holding invalid the broad claims of the Marconi patent must be affirmed. In view of our interpretation of the Stone application and patent, we need not consider the correctness of the court's conclusion that, even if Stone's disclosures should be read as failing to direct that the antenna circuits be made resonant to a particular frequency, Marconi's patent involved no invention over Lodge, Tesla, and Stone.

— Marconi Wireless Tel. Co. v. United States, 320 U.S. 38.

There are claims the high court was trying to nullify a World War I claim against the United States government by the Marconi Company via simply restoring the non-Marconi prior patent.

== Personal life ==
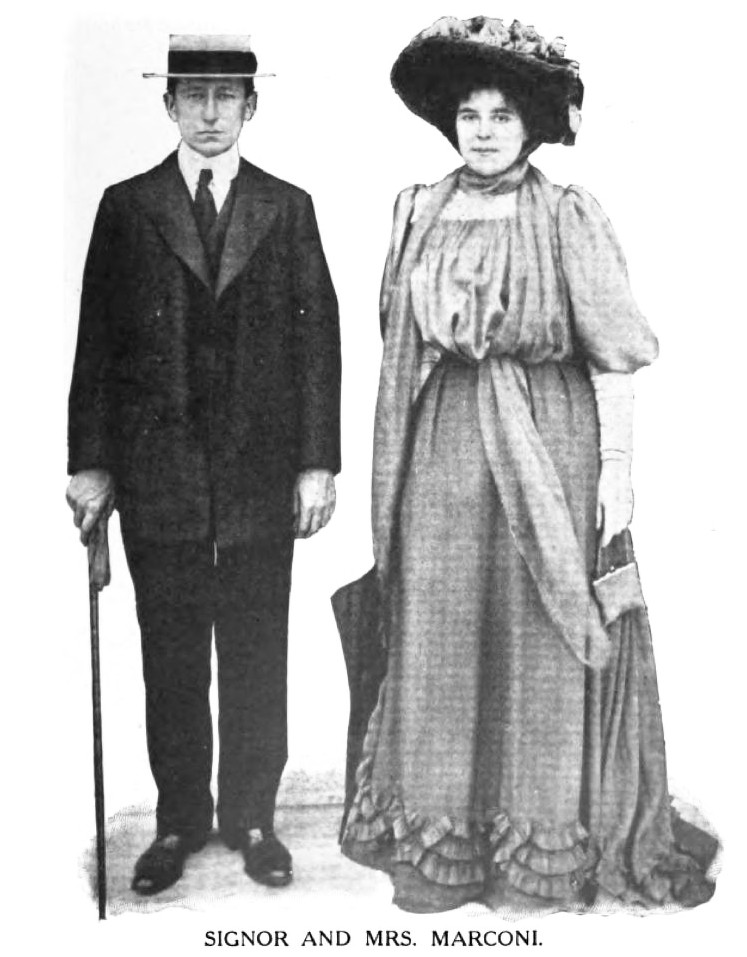
Guglielmo and Beatrice Marconi, 1910

Marconi was a friend of Charles and Florence van Raalte, the owners of Brownsea Island, and of their daughter, Margherita. In 1904, he met Margherita's Irish friend, The Hon. Beatrice O'Brien (1882–1976), the daughter of Edward O'Brien, 14th Baron Inchiquin. On 16 March 1905, Guglielmo and Beatrice were married, and spent their honeymoon on Brownsea Island. They had three daughters: Lucia (born and died 1906), Degna (1908–1998), and Gioia (1916–1996); and a son, Giulio (1910–1971), who became 2nd Marquess. In 1913, the family returned to Italy and became part of Rome society; Beatrice served as a lady-in-waiting to Queen Elena. At Marconi's request, his marriage to Beatrice was annulled on 27 April 1927, so he could remarry.

Marconi wanted to marry Maria Cristina Bezzi-Scali (2 April 1900 – 15 July 1994), the only daughter of Francesco, Count Bezzi-Scali. To do this, he had to be confirmed in the Catholic faith and became a devout member of the Church. He had been baptised Catholic but was brought up as a member of the Anglican Church. On 12 June 1927, he married Maria in a civil service, with a religious ceremony performed on 15 June. He was 53-years-old, while Maria was only 27. They had one daughter, Maria Elettra Elena Anna (born 1930), goddaughter of Queen Elena, who married Prince Carlo Giovannelli (1942–2016) in 1966; they later divorced. For unexplained reasons, Marconi left his entire fortune to his second wife and their only child, and nothing to the children of his first marriage.

In 1931, Marconi personally introduced the first radio broadcast of a Pope, Pius XI, and announced at the microphone: "With the help of God, who places so many mysterious forces of nature at man's disposal, I have been able to prepare this instrument which will give to the faithful of the entire world the joy of listening to the voice of the Holy Father."

== Recognition ==
=== Memberships ===
Year	Organisation	Type	Ref.
1901	(United States) American Philosophical Society	International Member	
1912	(Kingdom of Italy) Accademia dei Lincei	National Member	
1932	(United States) National Academy of Sciences	International Member	
1936	(Vatican City) Pontifical Academy of Sciences	Academician	

=== Awards ===
Year	Organisation	Award	Citation	Ref.
1901	(Kingdom of Italy) Accademia dei XL	Matteucci Medal		
1909	(Sweden) Royal Swedish Academy of Sciences	Nobel Prize in Physics (Note: Awarded jointly with Ferdinand Braun.)	"In recognition of their contributions to the development of wireless telegraphy."	
1914	(United Kingdom of Great Britain and Ireland) Royal Society of Arts	Albert Medal		
1918	(United States) Franklin Institute	Franklin Medal	"For the application of radio waves to communication."	
1920	(United States) Institute of Radio Engineers	IRE Medal of Honor	"In recognition of his pioneer work in radio telegraphy."	
1923	(United States) AAES	John Fritz Medal		
1931	(United States) Franklin Institute; (United States) Philadelphia City Council	John Scott Medal		
1934	(Federal State of Austria) Austrian Trade Association	Wilhelm Exner Medal		

=== Chivalric titles ===
Year	Head of state	Title	Ref.
1902	(Kingdom of Italy) Victor Emmanuel III	Knight of the Order of Merit for Labour	
1929	(Kingdom of Italy) Victor Emmanuel III	Marquess	

== Commemoration ==
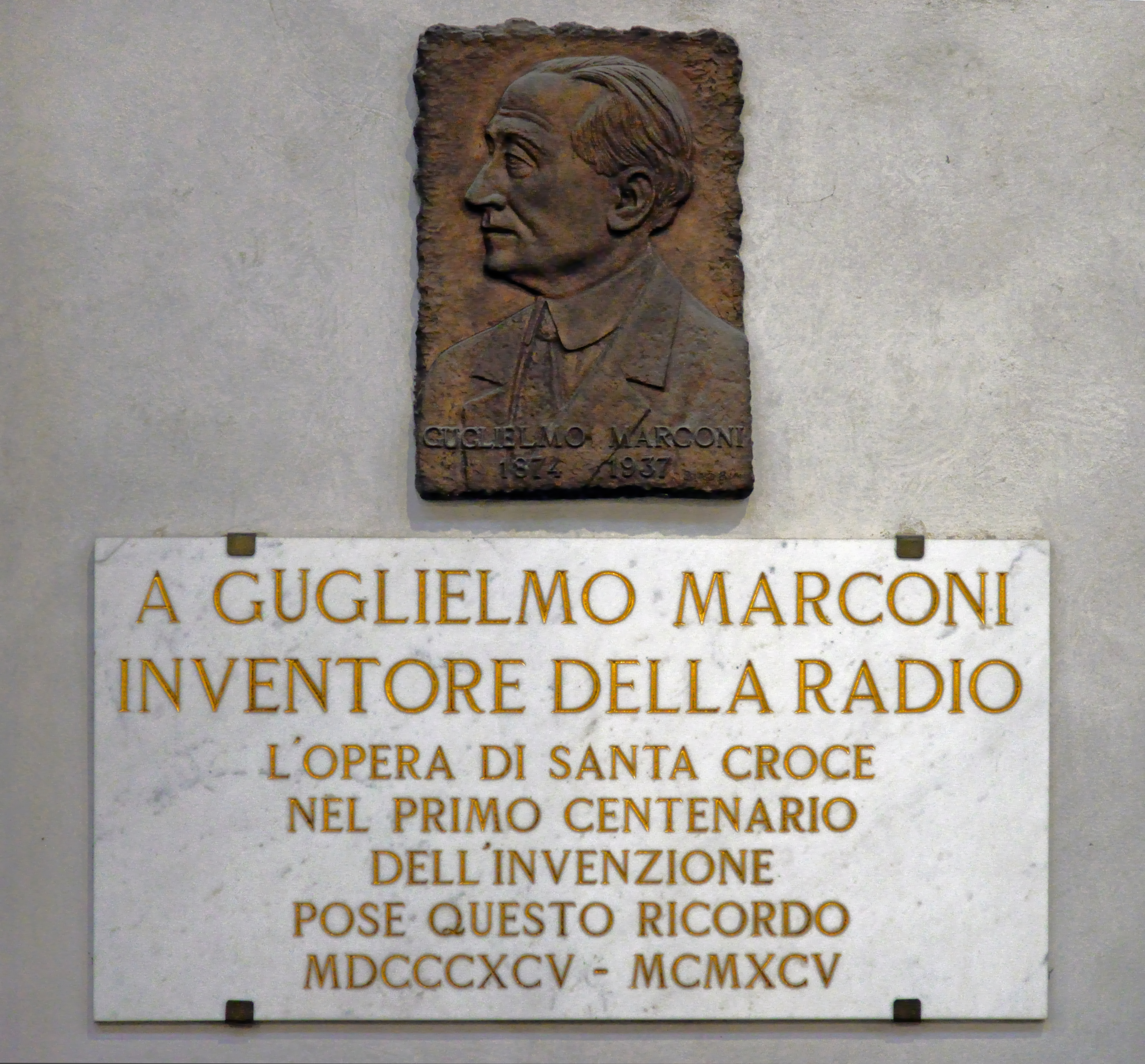
Memorial plaque in the Basilica Santa Croce, Florence, Italy.

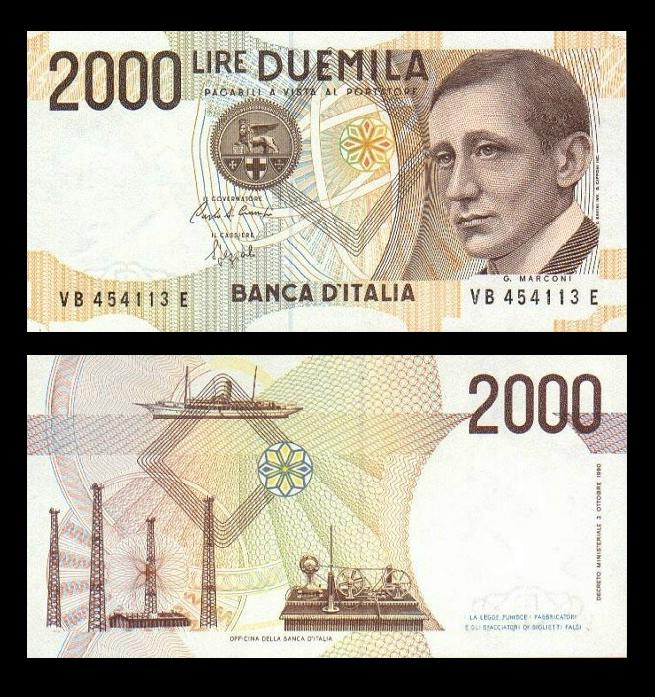
Italian lira banknote, 1990 issue

- In 1974, Italy marked the birth centennial of Marconi with a circulating commemorative Lire 100 coin.
- In 1975, Marconi was inducted into the National Inventors Hall of Fame.
- In 1978, Marconi was inducted into the NAB Broadcasting Hall of Fame.
- In 1988, the Radio Hall of Fame (Museum of Broadcast Communications, Chicago) inducted Marconi as a Pioneer (soon after the inception of its awards).
- In 1990, the Bank of Italy issued a Lire 2,000 banknote featuring his portrait on the front and on the back his accomplishments.
- In 2001, Great Britain released a commemorative £2 coin celebrating the 100th anniversary of Marconi's first wireless communication.
- Marconi's early experiments in wireless telegraphy were the subject of two IEEE Milestones; one in Switzerland in 2003 and most recently in Italy in 2011.
- In 2009, Italy issued a commemorative silver 10 Euro coin honouring the centennial of Marconi's Nobel Prize.
- In 2009, he was inducted into the New Jersey Hall of Fame.
- The Dutch radio academy bestows the Marconi Awards annually for outstanding radio programmes, presenters and stations.
- The National Association of Broadcasters (US) bestows the annual NAB Marconi Radio Awards also for outstanding radio programmes and stations.

=== Tributes ===
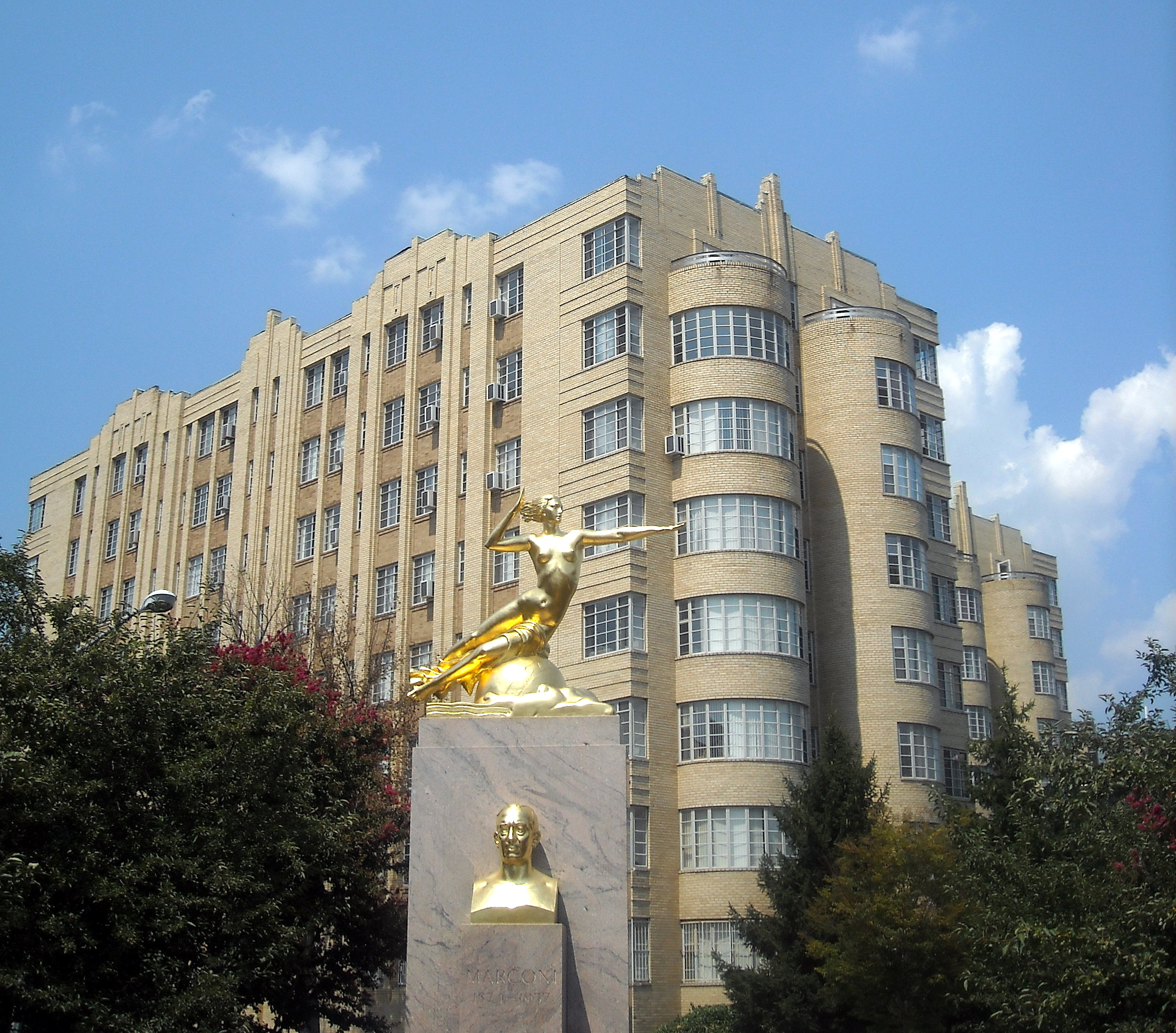
Guglielmo Marconi Memorial in Washington, D.C.

Bronze statue of Guglielmo Marconi, sculpted by Saleppichi Giancarlo and erected in 1975 in Philadelphia, Pennsylvania.

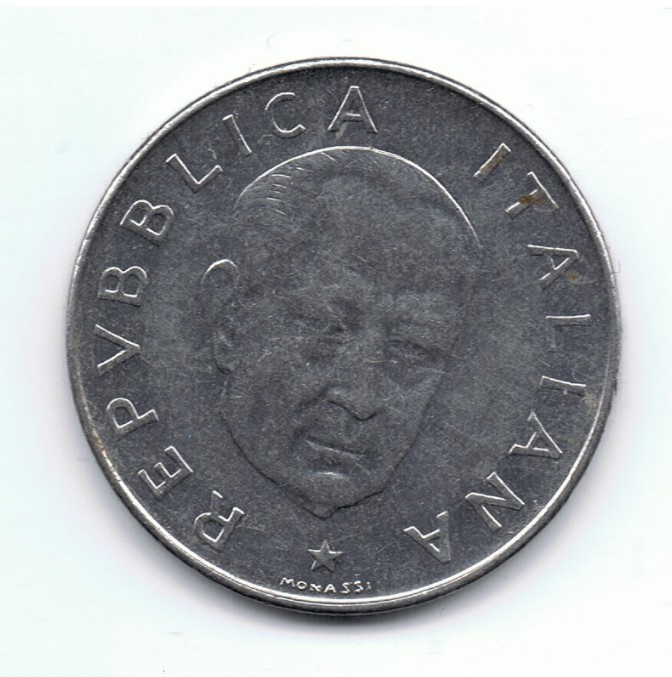
Italian 100 lire coin from 1974 commemorating the centenary of Marconi's birth.

- A funerary monument to the effigy of Marconi can be seen in the Basilica of Santa Croce, Florence, but his remains are in the Mausoleum of Guglielmo Marconi in Sasso Marconi, Italy. His former villa, adjacent to the mausoleum is the Marconi Museum (Italy) with much of his equipment.
- A Guglielmo Marconi sculpture by Attilio Piccirilli stands in Washington, D.C.
- A granite obelisk stands on the cliff top near the site of Marconi's Marconi's Poldhu Wireless Station in Cornwall, commemorating the first transatlantic transmission.
- Marconi Plaza Park, an urban park square named after the inventor in 1937, is located Philadelphia, Pennsylvania at Oregon Ave and South Broad Street. It includes a later 1975 bronze statue of Marconi erected on the east side.
- Marconi Plays The Mambo are lyrics written by co-writers Martin Page and Bernie Taupin to the 1985 hit single We Built This City, performed by American rock band Starship. The song peaked at No. 1 on the Billboard Hot 100.

Places and organisations named after Marconi include:

Outer space

The asteroid 1332 Marconia is named in his honour. A large crater on the far side of the Moon is also named after him.

Italy

- Bologna Guglielmo Marconi Airport (IATA: BLQ – ICAO: LIPE), of Bologna, is named after Marconi, its native son.
- Guglielmo Marconi University, a private, non-profit university in Rome.
- Ponte Guglielmo Marconi, bridge that connects Piazza Augusto Righi with Piazza Tommaso Edison, in Rome.

Australia

- Australian football (soccer) and social club Marconi Stallions.

Canada

- The Marconi's Wireless Telegraph Company of Canada (now CMC Electronics and Ultra Electronics), of Montreal, Quebec, Canada, was created in 1903 by Guglielmo Marconi. In 1925 the company was renamed to the 'Canadian Marconi Company', which was acquired by English Electric in 1953. The company name changed again to CMC Electronics Inc. (French: CMC Électronique) in 2001. In 2002, the company's historical radio business was sold to Ultra Electronics to become Ultra Electronics TCS Inc., now doing business as Ultra Communications. Both CMC Electronics and Ultra Communications are still located in Montreal.
- The Marconi National Historic Sites of Canada was created by Parks Canada as a tribute to Marconi's vision in the development of radio telecommunications. The first official wireless message was sent from this location by the Atlantic Ocean to England in 1902. The museum site is located in Glace Bay, Nova Scotia, at Table Head on Timmerman Street.

United States

- Marconi Conference Center and State Historic Park, site of the transoceanic Marshall Receiving Station, Marshall, California.
- Marconi-RCA Bolinas Transmitting Station in Bolinas, California.
- Station KPH, Marconi Wireless Telegraph Company of America in Inverness, California.
- Marconi Wireless Telegraphy Station on Oahu's North Shore, Hawaii, briefly the world's most powerful telegraph station.
- Marconi Beach in Wellfleet, Massachusetts, part of the Cape Cod National Seashore, located near the site of his first transatlantic wireless signal from the United States to Britain. There are still remnants of the wireless tower at this beach and at Forest Road Beach in Chatham, Massachusetts.
- New Brunswick Marconi Station, now the Guglielmo Marconi Memorial Plaza in Somerset, New Jersey. President Woodrow Wilson's Fourteen Points speech was transmitted from the site in 1918.
- Belmar Marconi Station, now the InfoAge Science History Center in Wall Township, New Jersey.

The Marconi Wireless Company of America, the world's first radio company, was incorporated in Roselle Park New Jersey, on West Westfield Avenue, on 22 November 1899.

- La Scuola d'Italia Guglielmo Marconi on New York City's Upper East Side.
- Marconi Plaza, Philadelphia, Pennsylvania. Roman terrace-styled plaza originally designed by the architects Olmsted Brothers in 1914–1916, built as the grand entrance for the 1926 Sesquicentennial Exposition and renamed to honour Marconi.

== Collections ==
- A large collection of Marconi artefacts was held by The General Electric Company, plc (GEC) of the United Kingdom which later renamed itself Marconi plc and Marconi Corporation plc. In December 2004 the extensive Marconi Collection, held at the former Marconi Research Centre at Great Baddow, Chelmsford, Essex UK was donated to the nation by the Company via the University of Oxford. This consisted of the BAFTA award-winning MarconiCalling website, some 250+ physical artefacts and the massive ephemera collection of papers, books, patents and many other items. The artefacts are now held by History of Science Museum, Oxford and the ephemera Archives by the nearby Bodleian Library. Following three years' work at the Bodleian, an Online Catalogue to the Marconi Archives was released in November 2008.

== Patents ==
United Kingdom

- British patent No. 12,039 (1897) "Improvements in Transmitting Electrical impulses and Signals, and in Apparatus therefor". Date of Application 2 June 1896; Complete Specification Left, 2 March 1897; Accepted, 2 July 1897 (later claimed by Oliver Lodge to contain his own ideas which he failed to patent).
- British patent No. 7,777 (1900) "Improvements in Apparatus for Wireless Telegraphy". Date of Application 26 April 1900; Complete Specification Left, 25 February 1901; Accepted, 13 April 1901.
- British patent No. 10245 (1902)
- British patent No. 5113 (1904) "Improvements in Transmitters suitable for Wireless Telegraphy". Date of Application 1 March 1904; Complete Specification Left, 30 November 1904; Accepted, 19 January August 1905.
- British patent No. 21640 (1904) "Improvements in Apparatus for Wireless Telegraphy". Date of Application 8 October 1904; Complete Specification Left, 6 July 1905; Accepted, 10 August 1905.
- British patent No. 14788 (1904) "Improvements in or relating to Wireless Telegraphy". Date of Application 18 July 1905; Complete Specification Left, 23 January 1906; Accepted, 10 May 1906.

United States

- U.S. patent 586,193 "Transmitting electrical signals", (using Ruhmkorff coil and Morse code key) filed December 1896, patented July 1897
- U.S. patent 624,516 "Apparatus employed in wireless telegraphy".
- U.S. patent 627,650 "Apparatus employed in wireless telegraphy".
- U.S. patent 647,007 "Apparatus employed in wireless telegraphy".
- U.S. patent 647,008 "Apparatus employed in wireless telegraphy".
- U.S. patent 647,009 "Apparatus employed in wireless telegraphy".
- U.S. patent 650,109 "Apparatus employed in wireless telegraphy".
- U.S. patent 650,110 "Apparatus employed in wireless telegraphy".
- U.S. patent 668,315 "Receiver for electrical oscillations".
- U.S. patent 676,332 "Apparatus for wireless telegraphy" (later practical version of system)
- U.S. patent 757,559 "Wireless telegraphy system". Filed 19 November 1901; Issued 19 April 1904.
- U.S. patent 760,463 "Wireless signaling system". Filed 10 September 1903; Issued 24 May 1904.
- U.S. patent 763,772 "Apparatus for wireless telegraphy" (Four tuned system; this innovation was predated by N. Tesla, O. Lodge, and J. S. Stone)
- U.S. patent 786,132 "Wireless telegraphy". Filed 13 October 1903
- U.S. patent 792,528 "Wireless telegraphy". Filed 13 October 1903; Issued 13 June 1905.
- U.S. patent 884,986 "Wireless telegraphy". Filed 28 November 1902; Issued 14 April 1908.
- U.S. patent 884,987 "Wireless telegraphy".
- U.S. patent 884,988 "Detecting electrical oscillations". Filed 2 February 1903; Issued 14 April 1908.
- U.S. patent 884,989 "Wireless telegraphy". Filed 2 February 1903; Issued 14 April 1908.
- U.S. patent 924,560 "Wireless signaling system". Filed 9 August 1906; Issued 8 June 1909.
- U.S. patent 935,381 "Transmitting apparatus for wireless telegraphy". Filed 10 April 1908; Issued 28 September 1909.
- U.S. patent 935,382 "Apparatus for wireless telegraphy".
- U.S. patent 935,383 "Apparatus for wireless telegraphy". Filed 10 April 1908; Issued 28 September 1909.
- U.S. patent 954,640 "Apparatus for wireless telegraphy". Filed 31 March 1909; Issued 12 April 1910.
- U.S. patent 997,308 "Transmitting apparatus for wireless telegraphy". Filed 15 July 1910; Issued 11 July 1911.
- U.S. patent 1,102,990 "Means for generating alternating electric currents". Filed 27 January 1914; Issued 7 July 1914.
- U.S. patent 1,226,099 "Transmitting apparatus for use in wireless telegraphy and telephony". Filed 31 December 1913; Issued 15 May 1917.
- U.S. patent 1,271,190 "Wireless telegraph transmitter".
- U.S. patent 1,377,722 "Electric accumulator". Filed 9 March 1918
- U.S. patent 1,148,521 "Transmitter for wireless telegraphy". Filed 20 July 1908; Issued 3 August 1915.
- U.S. patent 1,981,058 "Thermionic valve". Filed 14 October 1926; Issued 20 November 1934.
- U.S. patent RE11913 "Transmitting electrical impulses and signals and in apparatus, there-for". Filed 1 April 1901; Issued 4 June 1901.

== See also ==
- History of radio
- Jagadish Chandra Bose – Physicist, biologist and botanist (1857–1937)
- List of people on the postage stamps of Ireland
- List of covers of Time magazine (1920s)

== Sources ==
- Hong, Sungook (2001). Wireless: From Marconi's Black-Box to the Audion (PDF). Cambridge, Mass.: MIT Press. ISBN 0-262-08298-5. Archived (PDF) from the original on 19 August 2014.

Academic offices
Preceded by Jan Smuts	Rector of the University of St Andrews; 1934–1937	Succeeded by Robert MacGregor Mitchell
