= George Kemp (baseball) =

American baseball player

- Catcher
- Batted: Right Threw: Right

Negro league baseball debut
- 1943, for the New York Black Yankees

Last appearance
- 1943, for the New York Black Yankees
- Stats at Baseball Reference

Teams
- New York Black Yankees (1943)

George Walter Kemp is an American former Negro league catcher who played in the 1940s.

Kemp played for the New York Black Yankees in 1943. In 22 recorded games, he posted 11 hits in 70 plate appearances.
