= George Stephen Kemp =

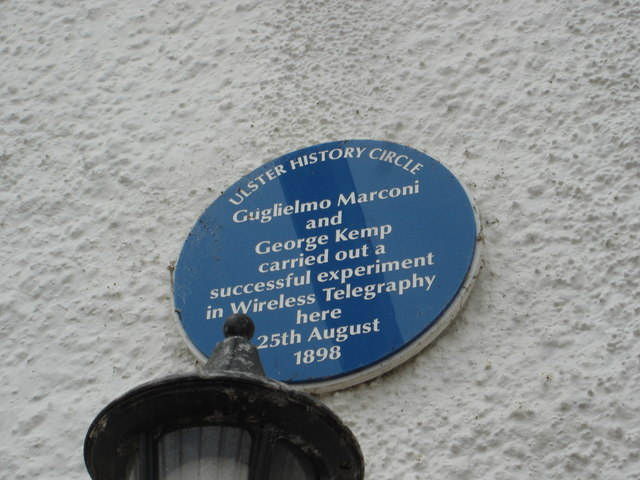
Plaque commemorating Marconi and Kemp in Ballycastle

George Stephen Kemp (1857 - 2 January, 1933, Southampton) was an electrical engineer and the first personal assistant to Guglielmo Marconi.Kemp was with Marconi at Kenmara House, Ballycastle, County Antrim when they carried out a successful experiment in Wireless Telegraphy on 25 August, 1898.

Kemp was a Royal Navy Instructor and electrician stationed on HMS Defiance. In July 1896 he came to the attention of Sir Henry Jackson who arranged for him to be seconded to work with William Preece at the Post office. The following year he started employment with Marconi, who he worked closely with until his death in 1933.
