= Rovolon =

- Comune
- Comune di Rovolon
- Location within Italy Location within Veneto
- Coordinates: 45°21′N 11°40′E
- Country: Italy
- Region: Veneto
- Province: Province of Padua (PD)
- Frazioni: Bastia, Carbonara, Lovolo

Government
  - Mayor: Maria Elena Sinigaglia

Area
  - Total: 27.69 km^{2} (10.69 sq mi)

Population (Jan. 2016)
  - Total: 4,970
  - Density: 179/km^{2} (465/sq mi)
- Time zone: UTC+1 (CET)
  - Summer (DST): UTC+2 (CEST)
- Postal code: 35030
- Dialing code: 049
- Patron saint: Santa Maria della Neve
- Saint day: 5 August
- Website: http://www.comune.rovolon.pd.it/

Rovolon is a comune (municipality) in the Province of Padua in the Italian region Veneto, located about 50 kilometres (31 mi) west of Venice and about 15 kilometres (9 mi) southwest of Padua. As of 31 December 2004, it had a population of 4,207 and an area of 27.6 square kilometres (10.7 mi^{2}).

The municipality of Rovolon contains the frazioni (administrative division of a municipality) Bastia, Carbonara, and Lovolo.

Bastia has a Sunday market and is by far the most populous town of the Rovolon municipality.

Rovolon borders the following municipalities: Albettone, Barbarano Vicentino, Cervarese Santa Croce, Montegaldella, Mossano, Nanto, Teolo, Vo.

== Demographic evolution ==
Historical population

Year	Pop.	±%
1861	?	—
1871	2,214	—
1881	2,879	+30.0%
1901	3,423	+18.9%
1911	4,336	+26.7%

Year	Pop.	±%
1921	5,224	+20.5%
1931	4,882	−6.5%
1936	4,682	−4.1%
1951	4,654	−0.6%
1961	3,858	−17.1%

Year	Pop.	±%
1971	3,472	−10.0%
1981	3,565	+2.7%
1991	3,834	+7.5%
2001	4,171	+8.8%

Source: Data from ISTAT

== Twin towns ==
Rovolon is twinned with:

- Cotiporã, Brazil, since 2010
