= Autostrada A31 (Italy) =

Controlled-access highway in Italy

Autostrada A31
- Autostrada della Val D'Astico; Val d'Astico motorway

Route information
- Maintained by ANAS
- Length: 88.7 km (55.1 mi)
- Existed: 1976–present

Major junctions
- South end: Strada statale 434 Transpolesana (Badia Polesine)
- A4 in Vicenza; SPV in Thiene
- North end: Piovene Rocchette

Location
- Country: Italy
- Regions: Veneto

Highway system
- Roads in Italy; Autostrade; State; Regional; Provincial; Municipal
← A 30	→ A 32

The Autostrada A31 or Autostrada della Val d'Astico ("Val d'Astico motorway") is an autostrada (Italian for "motorway") 88.7 kilometres (55.1 mi) long in Italy located in the region of Veneto which connects the trunk road Strada statale 434 Transpolesana (near Badia Polesine) with the town of Piovene Rocchette.

The Autostrada A31 is interconnected with the Autostrada A4 in the city of Vicenza. There are plans for an extension north of the motorway, connecting with Autostrada A22 near Besenello. The operator of the road was Autostrada Brescia Verona Vicenza Padova of A4 Holding.

== Route ==
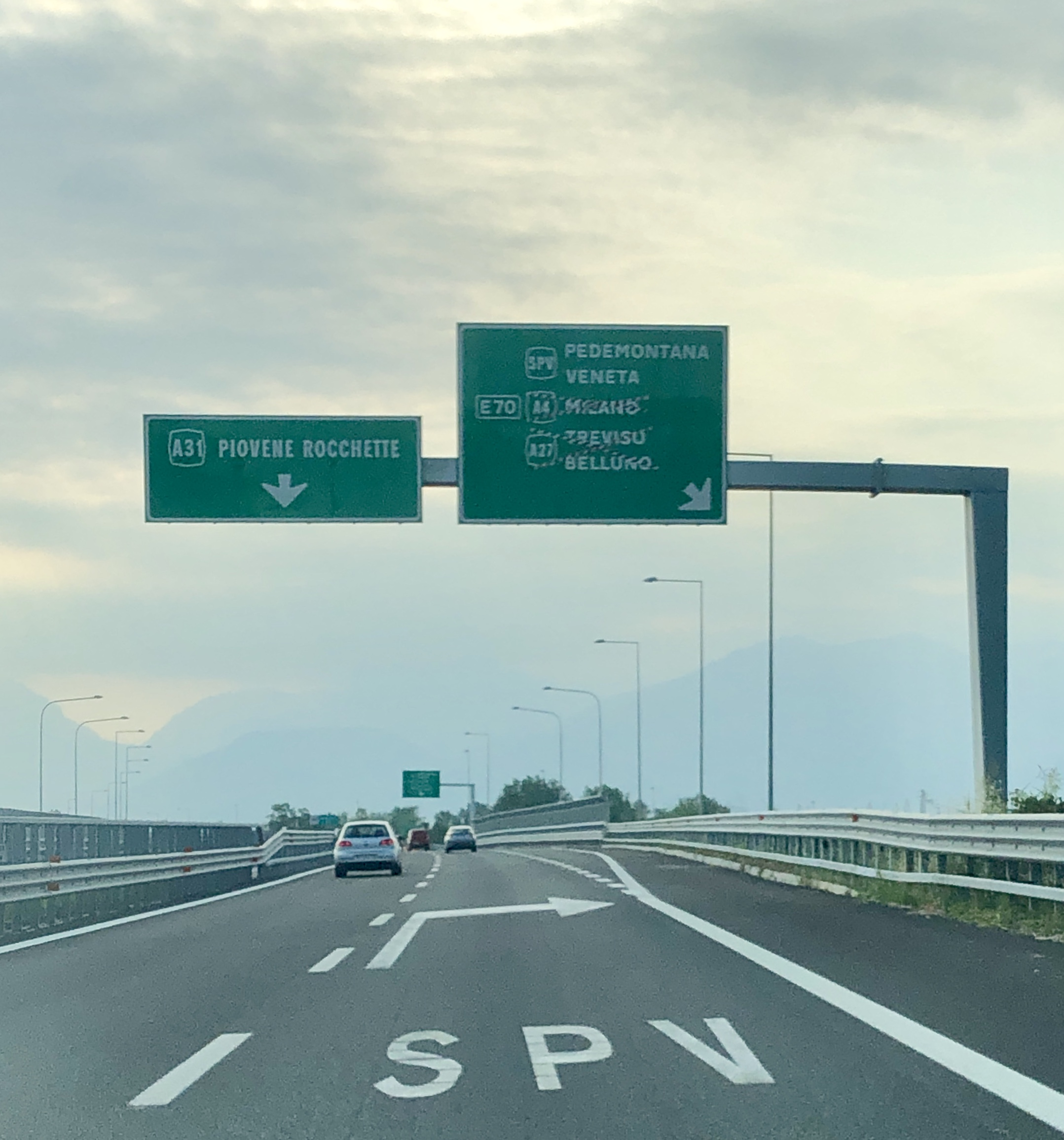
Autostrada A31 near Thiene

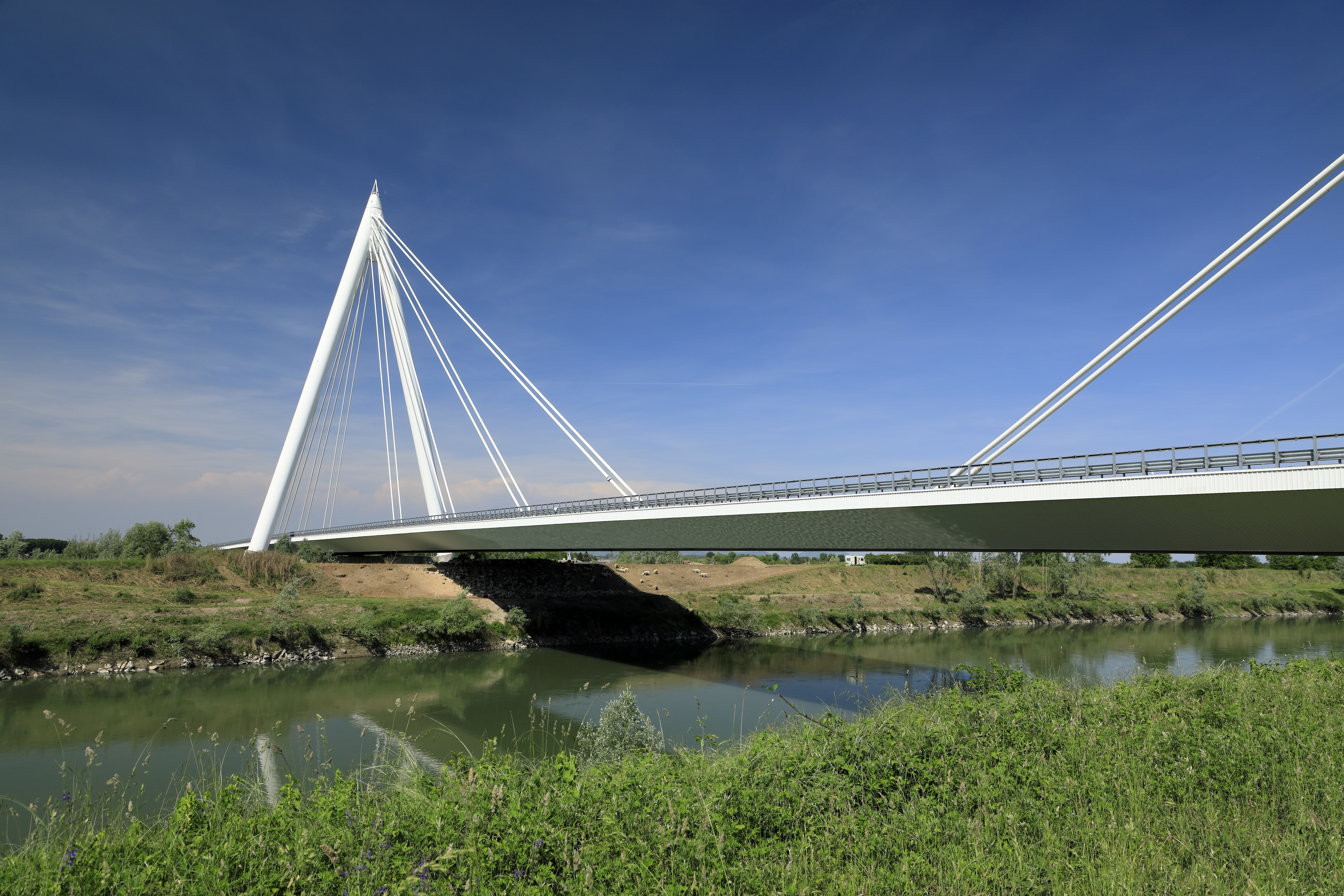
Autostrada A31 crosses the Adige river near Chiuppano

ROVIGO SS 434 - PIOVENE; Autostrada della Val D'Astico
Exit	↓km↓	↑km↑	Province	European Route
Strada statale 434 Transpolesana; Rovigo - Legnago - Verona	0.0 km (0 mi)	88.7 km (55.1 mi)	RO	--
Badia Polesine - Lendinara	4.0 km (2.5 mi)	84.7 km (52.6 mi)	RO	--
Toll gate Badia Polesine	5.0 km (3.1 mi)	83.7 km (52.0 mi)	RO	--
Piacenza d'Adige	8.0 km (5.0 mi)	80.7 km (50.1 mi)	PD	--
Santa Margherita d'Adige	18.0 km (11.2 mi)	70.7 km (43.9 mi)	PD	--
Noventa Vicentina	26.5 km (16.5 mi)	62.2 km (38.6 mi)	VI	--
Agugliaro	32.0 km (19.9 mi)	0.0 km (0 mi)	VI	--
Albettone - Barbarano Vicentino	38.5 km (23.9 mi)	50.2 km (31.2 mi)	VI	--
Rest area "Nanto" (Note: Only direction Rovigo.)	42.3 km (26.3 mi)	46.4 km (28.8 mi)	VI	--
Rest area "Castegnero" (Note: Only direction Vicenza-Piovene Rocchette.)	44.7 km (27.8 mi)	44.0 km (27.3 mi)	VI	--
Montegaldella - Longare	46.5 km (28.9 mi)	42.2 km (26.2 mi)	VI	--
A4 Turin - Trieste Milan - Verona - Padua - Venezia	53.0 km (32.9 mi)	35.7 km (22.2 mi)	VI	--
Vicenza Nord	61.6 km (38.3 mi)	27.1 km (16.8 mi)	VI	--
Rest area "Postumia"	63.4 km (39.4 mi)	25.3 km (15.7 mi)	VI	--
Dueville	69.6 km (43.2 mi)	19.1 km (11.9 mi)	VI	--
Pedemontana Veneta Montecchio Maggiore - Bassano del Grappa - Montebelluna - Treviso	76.5 km (47.5 mi)	12.2 km (7.6 mi)	VI	--
Thiene - Schio	79.5 km (49.4 mi)	9.2 km (5.7 mi)	VI	--
Piovene Rocchette - Chiuppano	88.7 km (55.1 mi)	0.0 km (0 mi)	VI	--

== See also ==
- Autostrade of Italy
- Roads in Italy
- Transport in Italy

=== Other Italian roads ===
- State highways (Italy)
- Regional road (Italy)
- Provincial road (Italy)
- Municipal road (Italy)
