= Cervarese Santa Croce =

- Comune
- Comune di Cervarese Santa Croce
- Location within Italy Location within Veneto
- Coordinates: 45°25′N 11°41′E
- Country: Italy
- Region: Veneto
- Province: Padua (PD)
- Frazioni: Fossona, Montemerlo

Government
  - Mayor: Massimo Campagnolo

Area
  - Total: 1,771 km^{2} (684 sq mi)
- Elevation: 30 m (98 ft)

Population (30 June 2017)
  - Total: 5,783
  - Density: 3.265/km^{2} (8.457/sq mi)
- Demonym: Cervaresani
- Time zone: UTC+1 (CET)
  - Summer (DST): UTC+2 (CEST)
- Postal code: 35030
- Dialing code: 049
- Website: Official website

Cervarese Santa Croce is a comune (municipality) in the Province of Padua in the Italian region Veneto, located about 50 kilometres (31 mi) west of Venice and about 14 kilometres (9 mi) west of Padua. The communal seat is in the frazione of Fossona.

Cervarese Santa Croce borders the following municipalities: Montegalda, Montegaldella, Rovolon, Saccolongo, Teolo, Veggiano.

The Castello di San Martino, on the Bacchiglione river, is a medieval castle surrounded by a park, a popular destination for walks.
