= Carrè =

- Comune
- Carrè di Vicenza
- Location within Italy Location within Veneto
- Coordinates: 45°45′N 11°27′E
- Country: Italy
- Region: Veneto
- Province: Vicenza (VI)
- Frazioni: Chiuppano, Lugo di Vicenza, Piovene Rocchette, Zanè, Zugliano

Area
  - Total: 8 km^{2} (3.1 sq mi)
- Elevation: 224 m (735 ft)

Population (31 August 2008)
  - Total: 3,603
  - Density: 450/km^{2} (1,200/sq mi)
- Time zone: UTC+1 (CET)
  - Summer (DST): UTC+2 (CEST)
- Postal code: 36010
- Dialing code: 0445
- ISTAT code: 024024
- Patron saint: Maria SS. Assunta
- Saint day: 15 August
- Website: Official website

Carrè is a town in the province of Vicenza, Veneto, Italy. It is east of SP349.

== Twin towns ==
Carrè is twinned with:

- Compans, France, since 2004
