= Barbarano =

Barbarano may refer to:

- Barbarano Mossano, comune in the Province of Vicenza in the Italian region Veneto
- Barbarano Romano, comune in the Province of Viterbo in the Italian region Latium
- Barbarano Vicentino, frazione of the comune of Barbarano Mossano, in the province of Vicenza, Veneto, north-eastern Italy
