= Andrea Nardin =

Italian politician

President of the Province of Vicenza
- Incumbent
- Assumed office 29 January 2023
- Preceded by: Francesco Rucco

Mayor of Montegalda
- Incumbent
- Assumed office 6 June 2016
- Preceded by: Riccardo Lotto

Personal details
- Born: 18 September 1972 (age 54) Vicenza, Italy
- Education: University of Padua

Andrea Nardin (born 18 September 1972) is an Italian politician who has served as president of the Province of Vicenza since 2023.

== Life and career ==
Born in Vicenza in 1972, Nardin graduated in political sciences from the University of Padua in March 2000. From 2010 to 2013, he served as director of Confcommercio Toscana, and from 2013 to 2015 as deputy director of Confcommercio Firenze. Since 2019, he has worked as a self-employed professional, providing consultancy and training activities for companies and individuals, with a focus on communication processes within organisations and insurance-related fields.

Nardin began his political career in May 2006, when he was elected to the municipal council of Montegalda within a civic list. During his time on the council, he also served as an assessor.

In June 2016, he was elected mayor of Montegalda. He was re-elected for a second term in the 2021 municipal elections.

On 29 January 2023, Nardin was elected president of the Province of Vicenza, supported by a centre-right coalition. He defeated Nicola Ferronato, mayor of Caldogno, receiving 52,041 weighted votes (60%), against Ferronato's 34,592 votes (40%).

In April 2025, Nardin joined Brothers of Italy and announced his intention to stand as a candidate in the 2025 Venetian regional election. He received 2,455 preference votes but was not elected to the Regional Council of Veneto.

In 2026, Nardin was elected vice president of UPI Veneto.
