= Carmignano di Brenta =

- Comune
- Comune di Carmignano di Brenta
- Coat of arms

- Location within Italy Location within Veneto
- Coordinates: 45°38′N 11°42′E
- Country: Italy
- Region: Veneto
- Province: Padua (PD)
- Frazioni: Camazzole

Government
  - Mayor: Alessandro Bolis (centre-right)

Area
  - Total: 14.7 km^{2} (5.7 sq mi)
- Elevation: 46 m (151 ft)

Population (31 May 2017)
  - Total: 7,609
  - Density: 518/km^{2} (1,340/sq mi)
- Demonym: Carmignanesi
- Time zone: UTC+1 (CET)
  - Summer (DST): UTC+2 (CEST)
- Postal code: 35010
- Dialing code: 049
- ISTAT code: 028023
- Patron saint: Madonna Assunta
- Saint day: August 15
- Website: Official website

Carmignano di Brenta is a comune (municipality) in the Province of Padua in the Italian region Veneto, located about 50 kilometres (31 mi) northwest of Venice and about 25 kilometres (16 mi) northwest of Padua.

Carmignano di Brenta borders the following municipalities: Cittadella, Fontaniva, Grantorto, Pozzoleone, San Pietro in Gu.

== Twin towns ==
Carmignano di Brenta is twinned with:

- Albbruck, Germany, since 1959
