= San Pietro in Gu =

- Comune
- Comune di San Pietro in Gu
- Coat of arms

- Location within Italy Location within Veneto
- Coordinates: 45°37′N 11°40′E
- Country: Italy
- Region: Veneto
- Province: Padua (PD)

Government
  - Mayor: Paolo Polati (Lista Civica)

Area
  - Total: 17.8 km^{2} (6.9 sq mi)
- Elevation: 44 m (144 ft)

Population (2007)
  - Total: 4,483
  - Density: 252/km^{2} (652/sq mi)
- Demonym: Guadensi
- Time zone: UTC+1 (CET)
  - Summer (DST): UTC+2 (CEST)
- Postal code: 35010
- Dialing code: 049
- Website: Official website

San Pietro in Gu is a comune (municipality) in the Province of Padua in the Italian region Veneto, located about 50 kilometres (31 mi) northwest of Venice and about 25 kilometres (16 mi) northwest of Padua.

San Pietro in Gu borders the following municipalities: Bolzano Vicentino, Bressanvido, Carmignano di Brenta, Gazzo, Grantorto, Pozzoleone, Quinto Vicentino.
