= Sarcedo =

- Comune
- Comune di Sarcedo
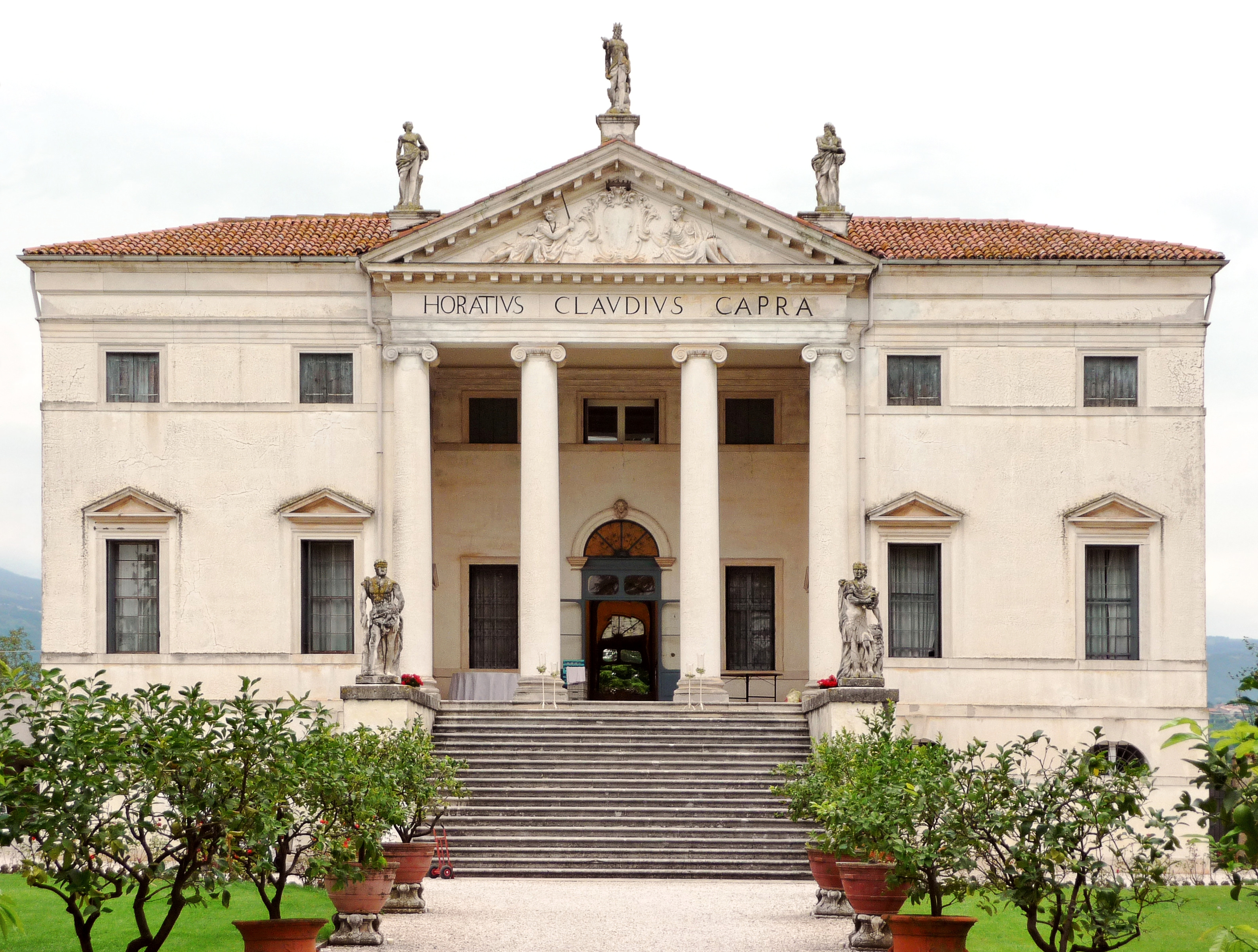
- Villa Capra, an eighteenth-century Palladian Venetian villa

- Location within Italy Location within Veneto
- Coordinates: 45°42′N 11°32′E
- Country: Italy
- Region: Veneto
- Province: Vicenza (VI)
- Frazioni: Breganze, Fara Vicentino, Montecchio Precalcino, Thiene, Villaverla, Zugliano

Area
  - Total: 13.76 km^{2} (5.31 sq mi)
- Elevation: 157 m (515 ft)

Population (31 December 2008)
  - Total: 5,327
  - Density: 387.1/km^{2} (1,003/sq mi)
- Demonym: Sarcedensi
- Time zone: UTC+1 (CET)
  - Summer (DST): UTC+2 (CEST)
- Postal code: 36030
- Dialing code: 0445
- ISTAT code: 024097
- Patron saint: Sant'Andrea Apostolo
- Saint day: 30 November
- Website: Official website

Sarcedo is a town in the province of Vicenza, Veneto, Italy. It is south of SP111. As of 2019 Sarcedo had an estimated population of 5,252.

== Geography ==
The Northern area of Sarcedo is composed of fertile hills of volcanic origins, the Eastern natural border is the torrent Astico and the Western border is the torrent Igna, right next to the Vicentine Alps. The Southern part of the village is an Alluvial plain.

The altitude varies from 80 to 203 m (262 to 666 ft) above sea level. The highest points are Cima Costa, Cima Colombara e Monte Canaglia. The view is vast and from Sarcedo are sometimes visible points of interest as the Monte Grappa, the Sette Comuni, Monte Summano, Monte Novegno, Cima Palon, from Piccole Dolomiti to Lessini, from Berici Hills to Euganean Hills and the below plain.

Sarcedo has a mild climate and is characterised by hills covered in an abundant and various Mediterranean vegetation, vineyards and cultivated fields, villas decorated with ornamental plants. Currently, only a small part is composed of forest with species as hop-hornbeam, ash and robinia.

== History ==
The name Sarcedo probably derives from the Latin word querquetum, which means oak forest. Indeed, still in contemporary times, the green area in the hills is composed of forest and centuries-old oaks. Maccà witnessed that this name was common to other areas as Lonigo, Castagnero and Lumignano.

The name appears for the first time in a document dated 983 AD, the Privilegium given by the Bishop of Vicenza Rodolfo to the Benedictine abbey of Saint Felix in Vicenza.

== Administration ==
| Name | Entered in charge | End of the mandate | Party | Notes |
|---|---|---|---|---|
| Luca Cortese | 26 May 2014 | Ongoing | Independent | |

== Sources ==
- (Google Maps)
