= UnipolMove =

Italian electronic toll device

Logo of UnipolMove

UnipolMove is a registered trademark owned by the group Unipol to distinguish the name of the electronic toll collection device of the same name by the group UnipolTech, which is the entire designer of the system, owner of the rental equipment in circulation and manager of the mobility services.

== History ==
In 2019, EU directive 2019/520 was adopted concerning the unification of the European electronic toll system, allowing the introduction of new operators. Initially the directive was valid only for heavy vehicles, but was later extended to light vehicles as well.

=== Device type ===
UnipolMove uses the same technology as other transponders already used in Italy: the OBU (On Board Unit). The device is the same one used by DKV (the Norbit VTR 850), complete with a plastic cover with the UnipolMove logo.

In 2023, UnipolMove was activated, together with the European Electronic Toll Service (SET), on the Pedemontana Veneta highway.

In 2024, UnipolMove was activated to serve the Strait of Messina in collaboration with Caronte & Tourist for the payment of the ticket for the crossing of the strait.
