= Bressanvido =

- Comune
- Comune di Bressanvido
- Coat of arms

- Location within Italy Location within Veneto
- Coordinates: 45°39′N 11°38′E
- Country: Italy
- Region: Veneto
- Province: Vicenza (VI)
- Frazioni: Bolzano Vicentino, Pozzoleone, San Pietro in Gu (PD), Sandrigo

Government
  - Mayor: Giuseppe Bortolan

Area
  - Total: 8 km^{2} (3.1 sq mi)
- Elevation: 57 m (187 ft)

Population (31 August 2010)
  - Total: 3,030
  - Density: 380/km^{2} (980/sq mi)
- Demonym: Bressanvidesi
- Time zone: UTC+1 (CET)
  - Summer (DST): UTC+2 (CEST)
- Postal code: 36050
- Dialing code: 0444
- ISTAT code: 024016
- Website: Official website

Bressanvido is a town in the province of Vicenza, Veneto, Italy. SP51 goes through it.
