= Crecchio Stele =

The Crecchio Stele is a sandstone stele of the 5th c. BC found in October 1846 in the contrada of Santa Maria Cardetola, part of the town of Crecchio, in the province of Chieti. The stele carries an inscription of several lines in the South Picene language and alphabet. The stele is currently in the Museo archeologico nazionale di Napoli.

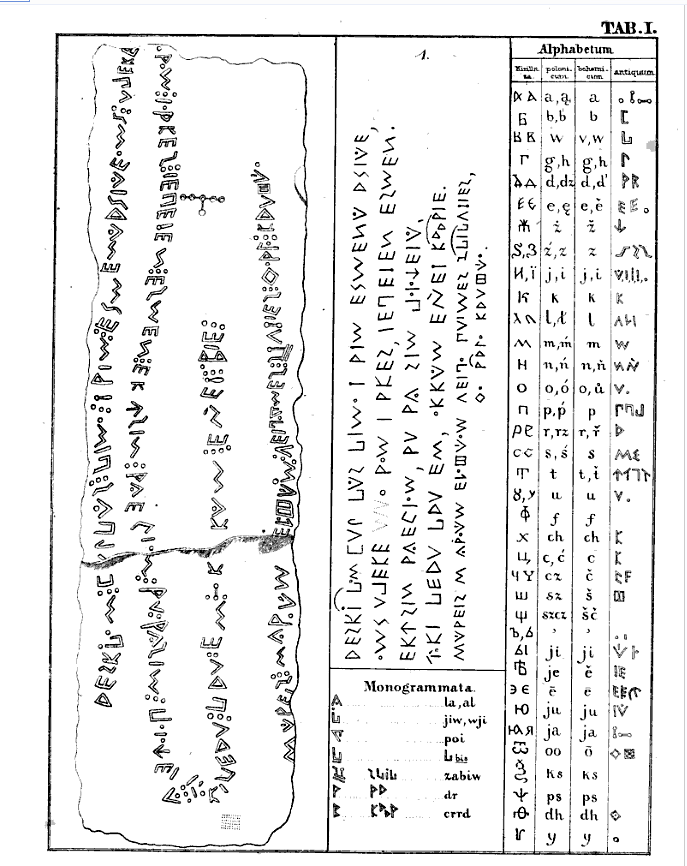
Reproduction of the stele of Crecchio

== Inscription ==
The stele inscription is written in South Picene, an Osco-Umbrian language belonging to the family of Italic languages and spoken in the first millennium BC in the area occupied by the ancient Italic Picene people.

This is a transcription of the text from the Picene alphabet:

deiktam h[lpas] pimoftorim esmenadstaeoms upeke[--]orom iorkes iepeten esmen ekúsim raeliom rufrasim poioúeta iokipedu pdufem ok[r]ikam enet bie múreis maroúm -elíúm uelaimes staties qora kduíú

=== Notes on the text ===
deiktam = "This (stele)", from the Greek root deik- ("to show")

poioúeta = likely derived from the Greek ποιεῖται ("he makes", "he does"), used in a ritual sense

okrikam = archaic construction that gave rise to the toponym Crecchio, with the meaning of "citadel" or "fortress"

qora = perhaps "wrote" or "this stone", from the Greek chôra or from an Osco-Umbrian root similar to sēma (“burial marker”)

This is not a literal translation because South Picene has not been completely deciphered. Nevertheless it is a plausible reconstruction based on linguistic analogies with archaic Latin, ancient Greek, and other Italic languages.

== Related articles ==
- it:Stele di Acquaviva Picena
- it:Stele di Busca
- Stele of Isola Vicentina
- it:Stele di Loro Piceno
- Nora Stone
- it:Stele di Novilara
- it:Stele di Todi
