= Zanè =

- Comune
- Comune di Zanè
- Coat of arms

- Location within Italy Location within Veneto
- Coordinates: 45°43′N 11°28′E
- Country: Italy
- Region: Veneto
- Province: Vicenza (VI)
- Frazioni: Carrè, Marano Vicentino, Piovene Rocchette, Santorso, Schio, Thiene, Zugliano

Area
  - Total: 7.64 km^{2} (2.95 sq mi)
- Elevation: 183 m (600 ft)

Population (28 February 2009)
  - Total: 6,615
  - Density: 866/km^{2} (2,240/sq mi)
- Demonym: Zanadiensi
- Time zone: UTC+1 (CET)
  - Summer (DST): UTC+2 (CEST)
- Postal code: 36010
- Dialing code: 0445
- ISTAT code: 024119
- Patron saint: Santi San Giuseppe
- Saint day: 19 March
- Website: Official website

Zanè is a town in the province of Vicenza, Veneto, Italy. It is north and south of SP349. As of 2007 Zanè had an estimated population of 6,553.

== Sources ==
- (Google Maps)
