= Officina Stellare =

Italian aerospace optical products manufacturer

Officina Stellare S.p.A.
- Company type: S.p.A. (Società per azioni) Joint-stock company
- Traded as: Euronext Growth
- Industry: Optical instruments
- Founded: 2009
- Headquarters: Sarcedo, Italy
- Products: Telescopes
- Website: www.officinastellare.com

Officina Stellare is an international engineering company based in Sarcedo, Italy. It designs opto-mechanical and aerospace instrumentation for ground based and space based applications.

The range of optical systems includes: Ritchey Chrétien, Aplanatic Ritchey Chrétien, Ultra Corrected Ritchey Chrétien, Riccardi Dall-Kirkham, Riccardi-Honders, Maksutov Cassegrain, Apochromatic Refractors, custom design optics.

== Observatories, scientific and educational institutes with Officina Stellare telescopes ==
- Cerro Tololo Inter-American Observatory - Coquimbo Region, Chile
- MIT Massachusetts Institute of Technology - Massachusetts, United States
- Caltech California Institute of Technology - California, United States
- National Taiwan University - Taipei, Taiwan
- Apache Point Observatory Galactic Evolution Experiment - Astronomical Observatory of Aosta Valley - St. Barthélemy, Italy
- SOFIA Stratospheric Observatory for Infrared Astronomy - NASA's Ames Research Center - California, United States

== See also ==
- List of Italian companies
