= Gas Jeans =

Italian clothing brand

- Company type: Private
- Industry: Fashion
- Founded: Chiuppano, Italy 1973
- Headquarters: Chiuppano, Italy
- Area served: Worldwide
- Key people: Claudio Grotto
- Products: Apparel and accessories
- Website: www.gasjeans.com https://www.gasjeans.in/

Gas Jeans stylized as GAS, is a leading premium apparel and denim brand owned by Grotto S.p.A., run by the Grotto family in Italy. The company was founded by Claudio Grotto in the early 1970s. Today, it operates in more than 56 countries, with more than 3,000 stores.

GAS targets its products at the youth segment. The brand is known in both the Italian fashion and worldwide fashion scenes to be simple, original and versatile.

Barbara Palvin has been in many GAS jeans ads, wearing a variety of GAS-brand jeans. One of the more popular images includes her in blue skin-tight jeans.

== Partnerships ==
GAS Jeans is the official clothing partner of the Repsol Honda Moto GP team.
