= Isola Vicentina =

- Comune
- Comune di Isola Vicentina
- Location within Italy Location within Veneto
- Coordinates: 45°38′N 11°27′E
- Country: Italy
- Region: Veneto
- Province: Vicenza (VI)
- Frazioni: Castelnovo, Ignago, Torreselle

Government
  - Mayor: Francesco Enrico Gonzo

Area
  - Total: 26.45 km^{2} (10.21 sq mi)
- Elevation: 55 m (180 ft)

Population (2010)
  - Total: 9,319
  - Density: 352.3/km^{2} (912.5/sq mi)
- Demonym: Isolani
- Time zone: UTC+1 (CET)
  - Summer (DST): UTC+2 (CEST)
- Postal code: 36033
- Dialing code: 0444
- Patron saint: St. Peter
- Saint day: June 29
- Website: Official website

Isola Vicentina is a small town and comune in the Italian province of Vicenza in the Veneto region. Its population is around 9,319.

== Twin towns ==
Isola Vicentina is twinned with:

- Mühlhausen, Upper Palatinate, Germany, since 1998
- Marau, Brazil, since 2012

== See also ==
- Stele of Isola Vicentina
