= Breganze =

- Comune
- Comune di Breganze
- Location within Italy Location within Veneto
- Coordinates: 45°42′N 11°34′E
- Country: Italy
- Region: Veneto
- Province: Vicenza (VI)
- Frazioni: Fara Vicentino, Mason Vicentino, Montecchio Precalcino, Sandrigo, Sarcedo, Schiavon

Area
  - Total: 21 km^{2} (8.1 sq mi)
- Elevation: 110 m (360 ft)

Population (31 October 2008)
  - Total: 8,689
  - Density: 410/km^{2} (1,100/sq mi)
- Demonym: Breganzesi
- Time zone: UTC+1 (CET)
  - Summer (DST): UTC+2 (CEST)
- Postal code: 36042
- Dialing code: 0445
- ISTAT code: 024014
- Patron saint: Maria SS. Assunta
- Saint day: 15 August
- Website: Official website

Breganze is a town in the province of Vicenza, Veneto, Italy. It is northeast of Via Romea. During World War II, the Germans were on one side of the river and the Allies were on the other, and a firefight occurred across the river.

== Breganze DOC ==
The area around Breganze is permitted to produce red and white Italian DOC wine. To be included in the DOC wine, the grapes must be harvested up to a maximum yield 14 tonnes/hectare (13 tonnes for the varietals) with the finished wine fermented to a minimum alcohol level of 11% (11.5% for varietals). A Superiore designation can be added if the wine attains a minimum alcohol level of 12%.

Red Breganze is composed of a minimum 85% Merlot with Marzemino, Cabernet Franc, Cabernet Sauvignon, Rossignola, Pinot noir and/or Freisa permitted to make up to 15% of the remaining blend. For the white Breganze, a minimum of 85% Friulano can be blended with Vespaiolo, Pinot bianco, Pinot grigio, Riesling Italico, Marzemina bianca and Sauvignon blanc also potentially included in the blend to fill in the remainder. Varietal wines can also be produced, provided that the grape variety makes up 100% of the wine (the only exception are the two Cabernets which can be a blend of both) with the grapes held to a more limited yield restriction and higher minimum alcohol content. Most of these wines are produced dry, with the exception being Vespaiolo that can be produced in both a dry and sweet passito style wine. When Vespaiola is used to produce a dessert style wine from partially dried grapes it may be labeled as Torcolato.

== Notable people ==
- Giannantonio Sperotto (born 1950), retired professional football player

== Economy ==
- Diesel (company)
- Laverda
- Laverda (harvesters)
- OTB Group
