= Pedemontana Veneta =

Controlled-access highway in Italy

Autostrada ASPV
- Pedemontana Veneta; Venetian foothills highway

Route information
- Maintained by Veneto region
- Length: 94.5 km (58.7 mi)
- Existed: 2019–present

Major junctions
- West end: Montecchio Maggiore
- A4 in Montecchio Maggiore; A31 in Malo; A27 in Spresiano
- East end: Spresiano

Location
- Country: Italy
- Regions: Veneto

Highway system
- Roads in Italy; Autostrade; State; Regional; Provincial; Municipal

Superstrada Pedemontana Veneta ("Venetian foothills highway") is an autostrada (Italian for "motorway") 94.5 kilometres (58.7 mi) long in Italy located in the region of Veneto owned by the Veneto region in toll concession which connects Montecchio Maggiore to Spresiano. It does not have an alphanumeric classification like the other Italian motorways, but is identified by the abbreviation SPV.

== Route ==
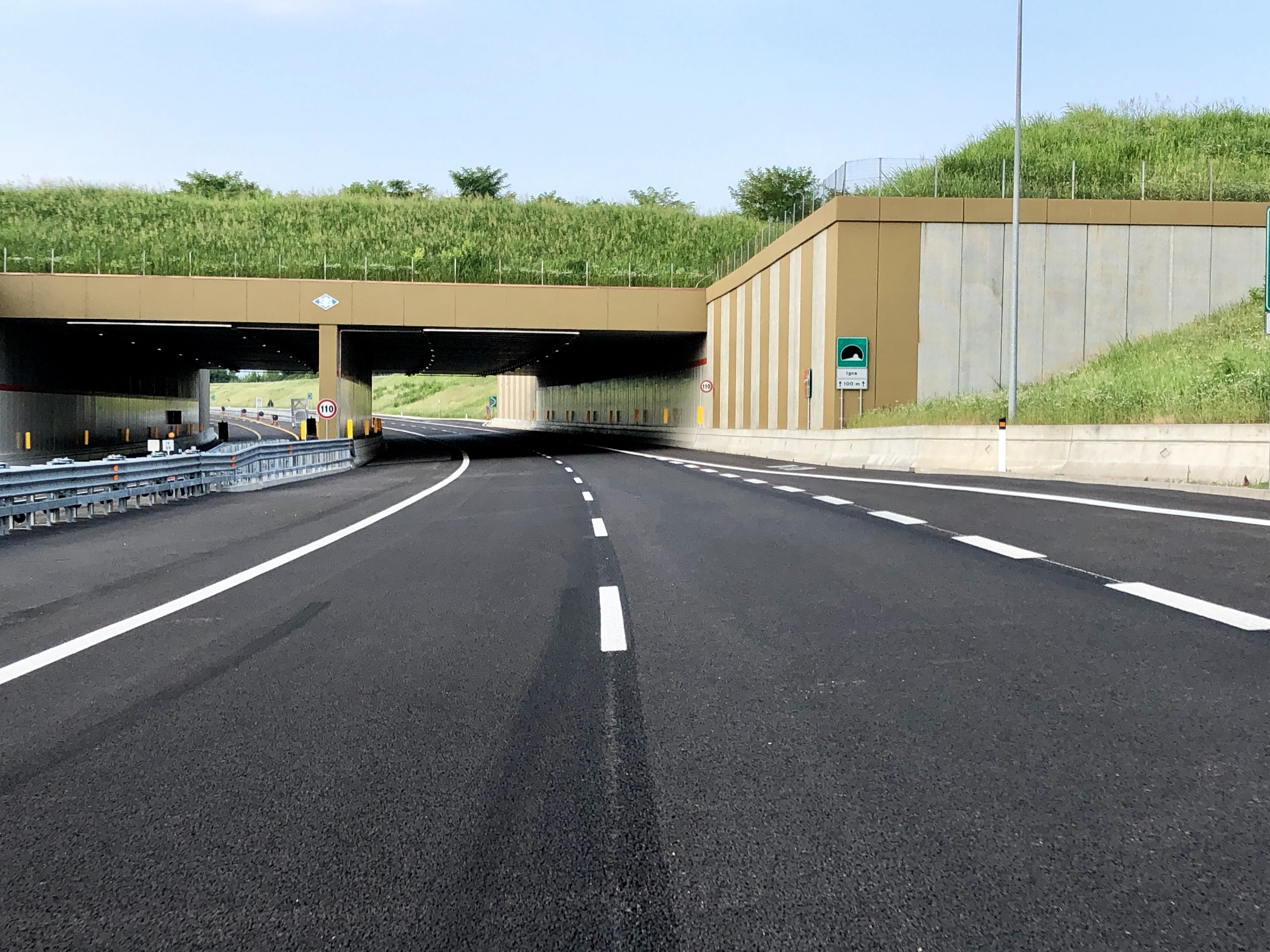
Pedemontana Veneta between Thiene and Breganze

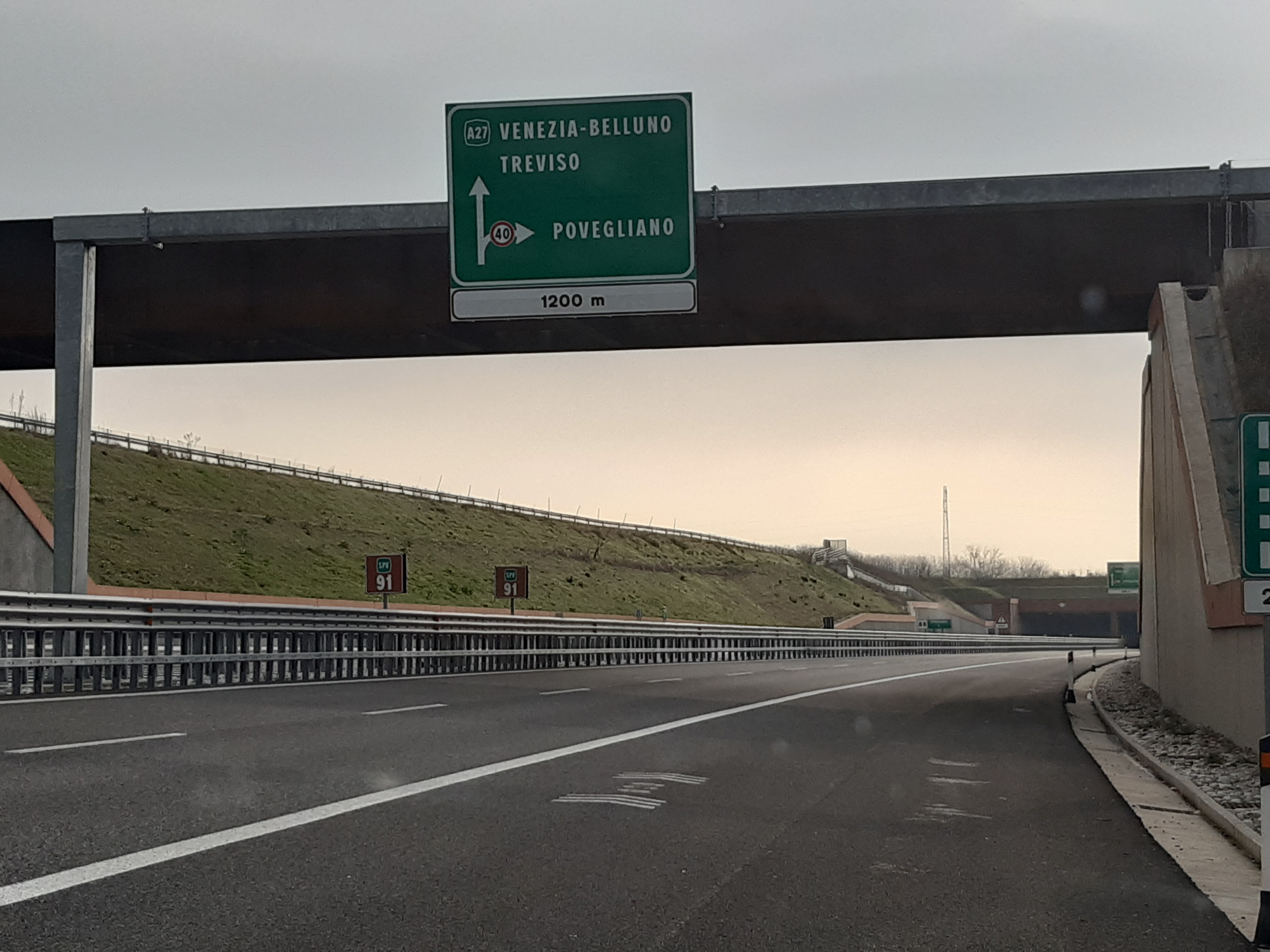
Pedemontana Veneta near Povegliano

PEDEMONTANA VENETA; Superstrada Pedemontana Veneta
Exit	↓km↓	↑km↑	Province	European Route
Turin – Trieste; Verona-Brescia-Milan-Turin	0.0 km (0 mi)	94.5 km (58.7 mi)	VI	--
Toll gate Montecchio Maggiore	0.3 km (0.19 mi)	94.2 km (58.5 mi)	VI	--
Montecchio Maggiore Sud (Note: Exit only in the direction of A4, entry only in the direction of Treviso) Padana Superiore - Vicenza - Montebello - Verona; Bretella di Alte Ceccato - Brendola - Lonigo di Altavilla	1.0 km (0.62 mi)	93.5 km (58.1 mi)	VI	--
Montecchio Maggiore Nord - Arzignano (Note: Exit only in the direction of A4, entry only in the direction of Treviso) di Recoaro - Valdagno; Arzignanese - Chiampo di Montecchio Maggiore	5.0 km (3.1 mi)	89.5 km (55.6 mi)	VI	--
Valle Agno; Cornedo Vicentino-Castelgomberto di Recoaro - Valdagno	14.0 km (8.7 mi)	80.5 km (50.0 mi)	VI	--
Malo del Pasubio- Vicenza – Schio – Rovereto	23.5 km (14.6 mi)	71.0 km (44.1 mi)	VI	--
Rovigo – Piovene Rocchette; Piovene Rocchette–Vicenza–Rovigo; Toll gate Valdastico	29.0 km (18.0 mi)	65.5 km (40.7 mi)	VI	--
Breganze; Chizzalunga - Sandrigo – Breganze; Nuova Gasparona - Thiene	34.5 km (21.4 mi)	60.0 km (37.3 mi)	VI	--
Rest area "Colceresa"	40.3 km (25.0 mi)	54.2 km (33.7 mi)	VI	--
Colceresa; Schiavonesca-Marosticana di Nove	41.5 km (25.8 mi)	53.0 km (32.9 mi)	VI	--
Bassano del Grappa Ovest di Granella - Tezze sul Brenta di Sant'Anna - Cittadella	48.0 km (29.8 mi)	46.5 km (28.9 mi)	VI	--
Bassano del Grappa Est - Rosà della Valsugana - Padova – Trento	52.5 km (32.6 mi)	42.0 km (26.1 mi)	VI	--
Loria – Mussolente di Volon - Cassola – Borso del Grappa; Castellana- Castelfranco Veneto – Venezia del Santo - Padova	56.0 km (34.8 mi)	38.5 km (23.9 mi)	TV	--
Riese Pio X di Fonte	59.5 km (37.0 mi)	35.0 km (21.7 mi)	TV	--
Rest area "Altivole"	62.5 km (38.8 mi)	32.0 km (19.9 mi)	TV	--
Altivole di Caerano - Castelfranco Veneto	68.5 km (42.6 mi)	26.0 km (16.2 mi)	TV	--
Montebelluna; Feltrina - Treviso – Venice	79.0 km (49.1 mi)	15.5 km (9.6 mi)	TV	--
Povegliano di Bolè	88.0 km (54.7 mi)	6.5 km (4.0 mi)	TV	--
Spresiano; Pontebbana Venice – Tarvisio	93.5 km (58.1 mi)	1.0 km (0.62 mi)	TV	--
Toll gate Spresiano - Villorba	93.6 km (58.2 mi)	0.9 km (0.56 mi)	TV	--
Venice – Belluno; Venice-Treviso-Belluno	94.5 km (58.7 mi)	0.0 km (0 mi)	TV	--

== See also ==
- Autostrade of Italy
- Roads in Italy
- Transport in Italy

=== Other Italian roads ===
- State highways (Italy)
- Regional road (Italy)
- Provincial road (Italy)
- Municipal road (Italy)
