= Fontaniva =

- Comune
- Comune di Fontaniva
- Location within Italy Location within Veneto
- Coordinates: 45°38′N 11°45′E
- Country: Italy
- Region: Veneto
- Province: Padua (PD)
- Frazioni: Casoni, Fontanivetta, Fratta, San Giorgio in Brenta

Government
  - Mayor: Alberto Trento

Area
  - Total: 20.6 km^{2} (8.0 sq mi)
- Elevation: 28 m (92 ft)

Population (31 August 2017)
  - Total: 8,077
  - Density: 392/km^{2} (1,020/sq mi)
- Demonym(s): Fontanivari, Bartandi, Fontanivesi
- Time zone: UTC+1 (CET)
  - Summer (DST): UTC+2 (CEST)
- Postal code: 35014
- Dialing code: 049
- Patron saint: St. Mary and Blessed Bartrando
- Saint day: 1 March
- Website: Official website

Fontaniva is a comune (municipality) in the Province of Padua in the Italian region Veneto, located about 50 kilometres (31 mi) northwest of Venice and about 25 kilometres (16 mi) northwest of Padua.

Fontaniva borders the following municipalities: Carmignano di Brenta, Cittadella, Grantorto, San Giorgio in Bosco.

== Twin towns ==
Fontaniva is twinned with:

- Bartın, Turkey, since 2005
- Amasra, Turkey, since 2005
- Nova Pádua, Brazil, since 2010
