= Grantorto =

- Comune
- Comune di Grantorto
- Location within Italy Location within Veneto
- Coordinates: 45°36′N 11°44′E
- Country: Italy
- Region: Veneto
- Province: Province of Padua (PD)

Area
  - Total: 14.1 km^{2} (5.4 sq mi)

Population (Dec. 2004)
  - Total: 4,414
  - Density: 313/km^{2} (811/sq mi)
- Time zone: UTC+1 (CET)
  - Summer (DST): UTC+2 (CEST)
- Postal code: 35010
- Dialing code: 049

Grantorto is a comune (municipality) in the Province of Padua in the Italian region Veneto, located about 50 kilometres (31 mi) northwest of Venice and about 25 kilometres (16 mi) northwest of Padua. As of 31 December 2004, it had a population of 4,072 and an area of 14.1 square kilometres (5.4 mi^{2}).

Grantorto borders the following municipalities: Carmignano di Brenta, Fontaniva, Gazzo, Piazzola sul Brenta, San Giorgio in Bosco, San Pietro in Gu.

== Demographic evolution ==
Historical population

Year	Pop.	±%
1861	?	—
1871	1,603	—
1881	1,759	+9.7%
1901	2,191	+24.6%
1911	2,828	+29.1%

Year	Pop.	±%
1921	3,256	+15.1%
1931	3,405	+4.6%
1936	3,542	+4.0%
1951	3,576	+1.0%
1961	3,049	−14.7%

Year	Pop.	±%
1971	3,312	+8.6%
1981	3,597	+8.6%
1991	3,741	+4.0%
2001	3,778	+1.0%

Source: Data from ISTAT

== Twin towns ==
Grantorto is twinned with:

- Fagnano Olona, Italy
- Grottole, Italy
