= Gazzo, Veneto =

Gazzo
- Comune
- Comune di Gazzo
- Coat of arms

- Location within Italy Location within Veneto
- Coordinates: 45°17′N 11°53′E
- Country: Italy
- Region: Veneto
- Province: Province of Padua (PD)
- Frazioni: Grossa, Gaianigo, Grantortino, Villalta

Government
  - Mayor: Ornella Leonardi (civic list)

Area
  - Total: 22.71 km^{2} (8.77 sq mi)
- Elevation: 36 m (118 ft)

Population (31-8-2017)
  - Total: 4,302
  - Density: 189.4/km^{2} (490.6/sq mi)
- Time zone: UTC+1 (CET)
  - Summer (DST): UTC+2 (CEST)
- Postal code: 35010
- Dialing code: 049
- ISTAT code: 028041
- Website: Official website

Gazzo is a comune (municipality) in the Province of Padua in the Italian region Veneto, located about 50 kilometres (31 mi) northwest of Venice and about 25 kilometres (16 mi) northwest of Padua. As of 31 August 2017, it had a population of 4,302 and an area of 22.7 square kilometres (8.8 mi^{2}).

The municipality of Gazzo contains the frazioni (subdivisions, mainly villages and hamlets) Grossa, Gaianigo, Grantortino, and Villalta.

Gazzo borders the following municipalities: Camisano Vicentino, Grantorto, Grumolo delle Abbadesse, Piazzola sul Brenta, Quinto Vicentino, San Pietro in Gu, Torri di Quartesolo.

== Demographic evolution ==
Historical population

Year	Pop.	±%
1861	?	—
1871	2,073	—
1881	2,236	+7.9%
1901	2,506	+12.1%
1911	2,959	+18.1%

Year	Pop.	±%
1921	3,468	+17.2%
1931	3,513	+1.3%
1936	3,630	+3.3%
1951	3,839	+5.8%
1961	3,215	−16.3%

Year	Pop.	±%
1971	2,892	−10.0%
1981	3,046	+5.3%
1991	3,101	+1.8%
2001	3,457	+11.5%

Source: Data from ISTAT
