= Mossano =

- Frazione
- Location of Mossano in Italy
- Coordinates: 45°25′N 11°33′E
- Country: Italy
- Region: Veneto
- Province: Vicenza (VI)
- Comune: Barbarano Mossano

Area
  - Total: 13 km^{2} (5.0 sq mi)

Population (28 February 2007)
  - Total: 1,782
  - Density: 140/km^{2} (360/sq mi)
- Time zone: UTC+1 (CET)
  - Summer (DST): UTC+2 (CEST)
- Postal code: 36024
- Dialing code: 0444

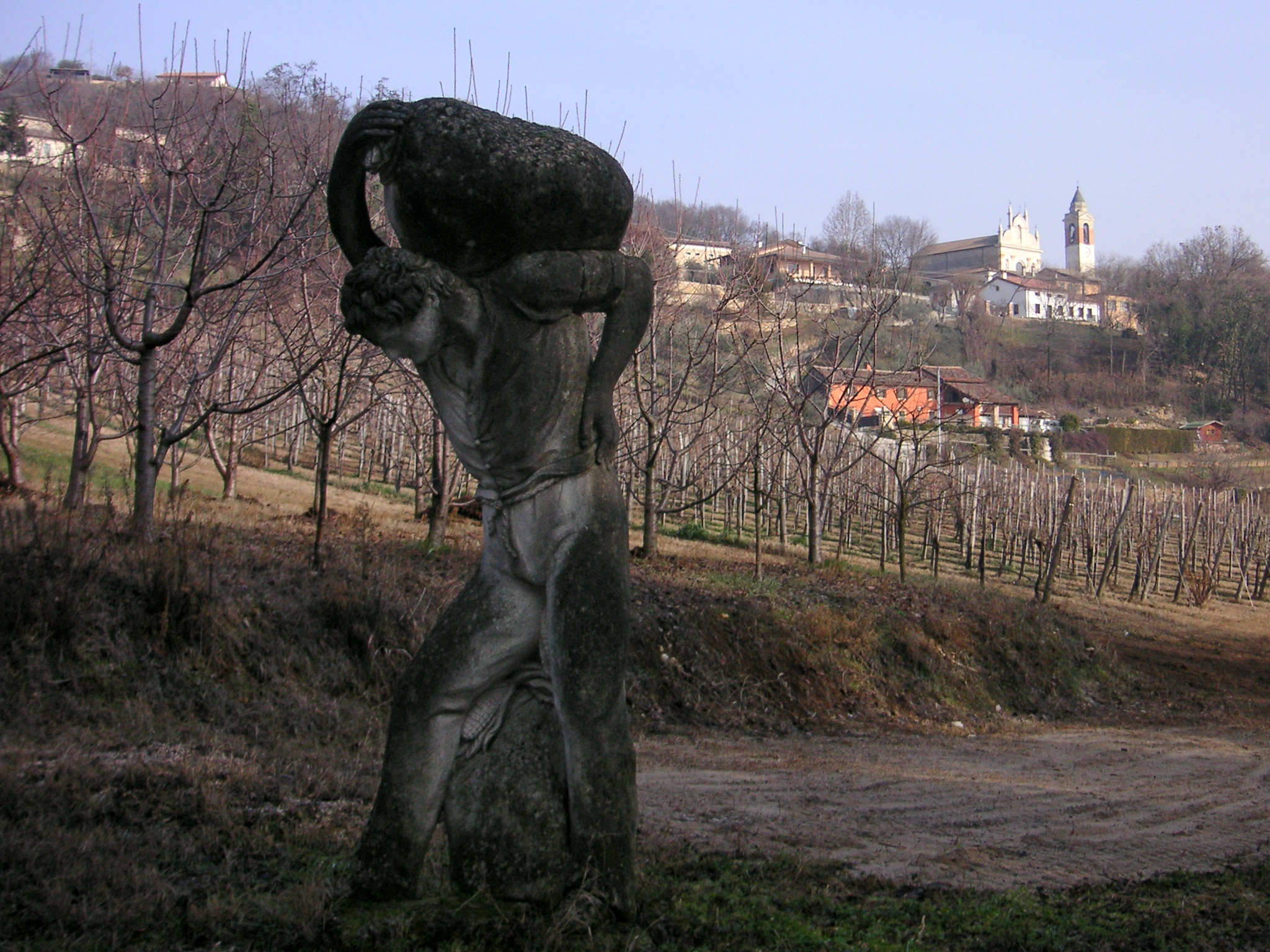
A view of the village from the San Bernardino's path

Mossano is a frazione of the comune of Barbarano Mossano in the province of Vicenza, Veneto, noerth-eastern Italy. It is west of SP247 provincial road.
