= Giannantonio Sperotto =

Italian footballer

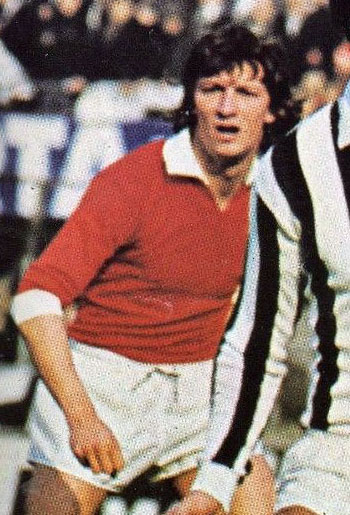
- Sperotto with Varese in 1975

Personal information
- Date of birth: November 7, 1950 (age 75)
- Place of birth: Breganze, Italy
- Height: 1.80 m (5 ft 11 in)
- Position: Striker

Senior career*
Years	Team	Apps	(Gls)
1969–1970	L.R. Vicenza	3	(0)
1970–1971	Udinese	35	(11)
1971–1972	Siracusa	38	(11)
1972–1973	Lucchese	31	(8)
1973–1974	Avellino	34	(8)
1974–1975	Varese	26	(5)
1975–1976	Napoli	10	(1)
1976–1977	Catanzaro	20	(2)
1977–1978	Roma	7	(0)
1978–1979	Reggiana	18	(4)
- * Club domestic league appearances and goals

Giannantonio Sperotto (born November 7, 1950, in Breganze) is an Italian former professional footballer.

He played for 5 seasons (66 games, 8 goals) in the Serie A for Vicenza Calcio, A.S. Varese 1910, S.S.C. Napoli, F.C. Catanzaro and A.S. Roma.
