= List of presidents of the Province of Vicenza =

President of the Province of Vicenza
- Presidente della Provincia di Vicenza
- Incumbent; Andrea Nardin since 29 January 2023
- Term length: 4 years
- Inaugural holder: Domenico Donati
- Formation: 1889

The president of the Province of Vicenza is the head of the provincial government in Vicenza, Veneto, Italy. The president oversees the administration of the province, coordinates the activities of the municipalities, and represents the province in regional and national matters.

Since January 2023, the office has been held by Andrea Nardin of Brothers of Italy.

== List ==
=== Presidents of the Provincial Deputation (1889–1924) ===
No.	Portrait	Name	Term		Party
No.	Portrait	Name	Start	End	Party
1		Domenico Donati	1889	1899	
2		Gaetano Bottazzi	1899	1904	
3		Tarcisio Biasin	1904	1908	
4		Marco Tattara	1908	1914	
5		Tito Galla	1914	1919	
6		Gabrio Frigo	1919	1920	
7		Adriano Navarotto	1920	1924	

=== Presidents of the Royal Commission (1924–1929) ===
No.	Portrait	Name	Term		Party
No.	Portrait	Name	Start	End	Party
1		Giuseppe Roi	1924	1926	National Fascist Party
2		Luigi Da Porto	1926	1929	National Fascist Party

=== Presidents of the Provincial Rectorate (1929–1945) ===
No.	Portrait	Name	Term		Party
No.	Portrait	Name	Start	End	Party
1		Luigi Da Porto	1929	1932	National Fascist Party
2		Annibale Tentori	1932	1936	National Fascist Party
3		Giulio Capuzzo Dolcetta	1936	1937	National Fascist Party
4		Antonio Franceschini	1937	1942	National Fascist Party
5		Giacomo Pellizzari	1942	1943	National Fascist Party
–		Edoardo Fanton (Prefectural commissioner)	1943	1945	Republican Fascist Party

=== Presidents of the Provincial Deputation (1945–1951) ===
No.	Portrait	Name	Term		Party
No.	Portrait	Name	Start	End	Party
1		Giovanni Giuliari	1945	1951	Italian Socialist Party

=== Presidents of the Province (1951–present) ===
No.	Portrait	Name	Term		Party
No.	Portrait	Name	Start	End	Party
1		Giorgio Oliva	1951	1958	Christian Democracy
–		Romolo Todescato (acting)	1958	1958	Christian Democracy
2		Renato Treu	1958	1967	Christian Democracy
3		Romolo Todescato	1967	1970	Christian Democracy
4		Bartolomeo Garzia	1970	1980	Christian Democracy
5		Giovanni Pandolfo	1980	1988	Christian Democracy
6		Domenico Calearo	18 November 1988	16 July 1990	Christian Democracy
7		Delio Giacometti	16 July 1990	22 June 1993	Christian Democracy
8		Giuseppina Del Santo	11 August 1993	24 April 1995	Christian Democracy; Italian People's Party
9		Giuseppe Doppio	8 May 1995	18 August 1997	Italian People's Party
–		Gian Valerio Lombardi	18 August 1997	1 December 1997	Special commissioner
10		Manuela Dal Lago	1 December 1997	28 May 2002	Lega Nord
10		Manuela Dal Lago	28 May 2002	30 May 2007	Lega Nord
11		Attilio Schneck	30 May 2007	31 May 2012	Lega Nord
–		Attilio Schneck	31 May 2012	12 October 2014	Special commissioner
12		Achille Variati	12 October 2014	13 June 2018	Democratic Party
13		Francesco Rucco	31 October 2018	29 January 2023	Independent (centre-right)
14		Andrea Nardin	29 January 2023	Incumbent	Brothers of Italy

== Sources ==
- "Storia amministrativa dell'ente". Ministero dell'Interno.
- Agostini, Filiberto (2012). Il governo locale nel Veneto all'indomani della liberazione. Milan: FrancoAngeli.
- Cogo, Egidio. "Breve storia della Provincia di Vicenza (1815–2012)" (PDF) (in Italian). Provincia di Vicenza. Archived from the original on 2023-07-05.
- Menichini, Piera (2005). "I presidenti delle Province dall'Unità alla Grande guerra: repertorio analitico". Storia Amministrazione Costituzione (13): 300–301.
