= Province of Vicenza =

Province of Italy, located in the Veneto region

Province of Vicenza Provincia di Vicenza (Italian) Provincia de Vicença (Venetian)
- Province
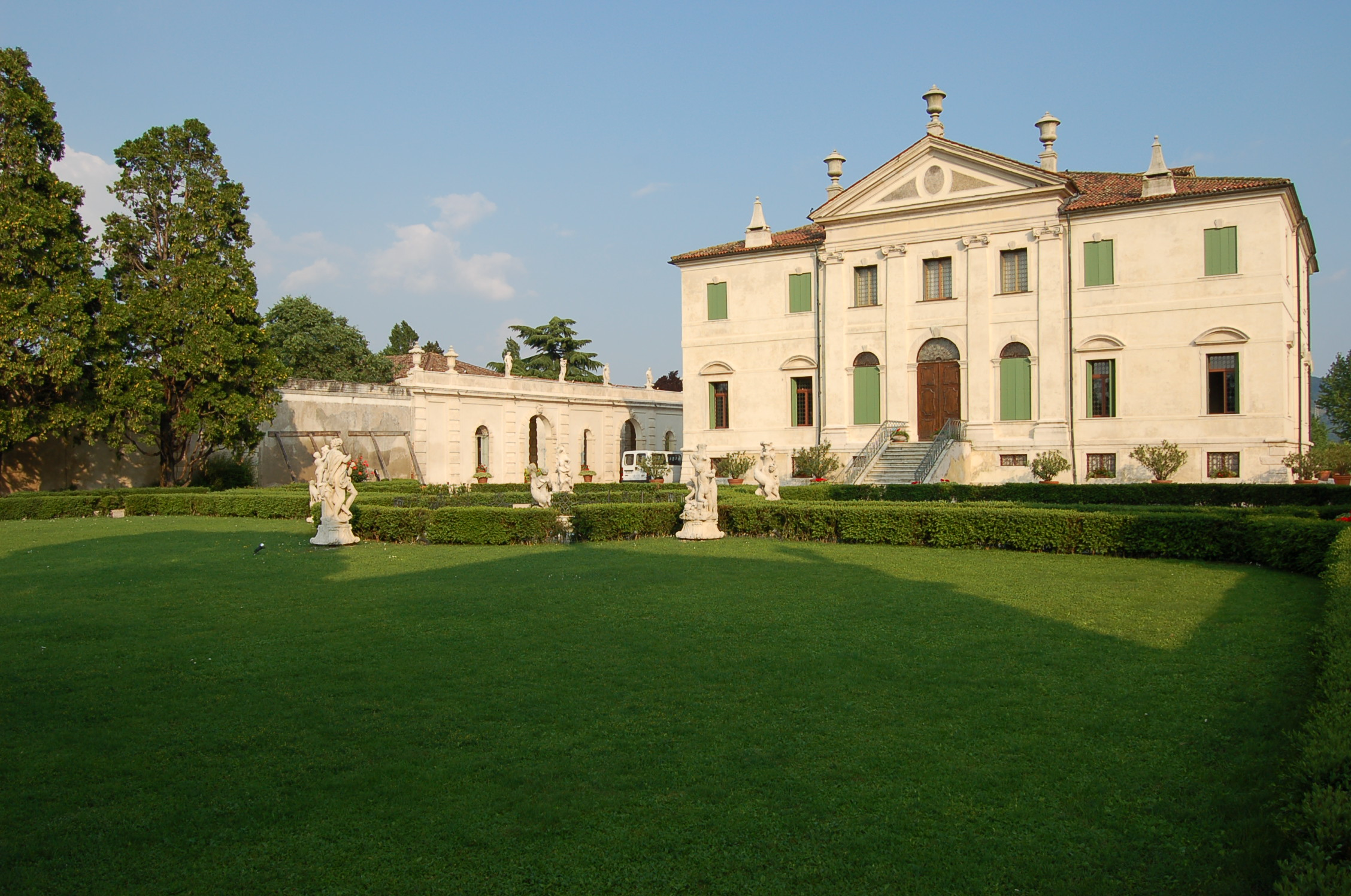
- Villa Cordellina Lombardi, the provincial seat

- Coat of arms

- Location of the province of Vicenza in Italy
- Coordinates: 45°33′N 11°33′E
- Country: Italy
- Region: Veneto
- Capital(s): Vicenza
- Municipalities: 112

Government
  - President: Andrea Nardin

Area
  - Total: 2,722.53 km^{2} (1,051.17 sq mi)

Population (2026)
  - Total: 855,212
  - Density: 314.124/km^{2} (813.577/sq mi)

GDP
  - Total: €27.697 billion (2015)
  - Per capita: €31,890 (2015)
- Time zone: UTC+1 (CET)
  - Summer (DST): UTC+2 (CEST)
- Postal codes: 36010–36078, 36100
- Telephone prefix: 0424, 0444, 0445
- ISO 3166 code: IT-VI
- Vehicle registration: VI
- ISTAT code: 024

The province of Vicenza (Italian: provincia di Vicenza, Venetian: provincia de Vicença) is a province in the region of Veneto in Italy. Its capital city is Vicenza.

The province has a population of 855,212 in an area of 2,722.53 square kilometres (1,051.17 sq mi) across its 112 municipalities.

Federico Faggin, an Italian physicist/electrical engineer principally responsible for the design of the first microprocessor, was born in Vicenza.

== Government ==
=== Municipalities ===
The province has 112 municipalities:

- Agugliaro
- Albettone
- Alonte
- Altavilla Vicentina
- Altissimo
- Arcugnano
- Arsiero
- Arzignano
- Asiago
- Asigliano Veneto
- Barbarano Mossano
- Bassano del Grappa
- Bolzano Vicentino
- Breganze
- Brendola
- Bressanvido
- Brogliano
- Caldogno
- Caltrano
- Calvene
- Camisano Vicentino
- Campiglia dei Berici
- Carrè
- Cartigliano
- Cassola
- Castegnero Nanto
- Castelgomberto
- Chiampo
- Chiuppano
- Cogollo del Cengio
- Colceresa
- Cornedo Vicentino
- Costabissara
- Creazzo
- Crespadoro
- Dueville
- Enego
- Fara Vicentino
- Foza
- Gallio
- Gambellara
- Grisignano di Zocco
- Grumolo delle Abbadesse
- Isola Vicentina
- Laghi
- Lastebasse
- Longare
- Lonigo
- Lugo di Vicenza
- Lusiana
- Malo
- Marano Vicentino
- Marostica
- Monte di Malo
- Montebello Vicentino
- Montecchio Maggiore
- Montecchio Precalcino
- Montegalda
- Montegaldella
- Monteviale
- Monticello Conte Otto
- Montorso Vicentino
- Mussolente
- Nogarole Vicentino
- Nove
- Noventa Vicentina
- Orgiano
- Pedemonte
- Pianezze
- Piovene Rocchette
- Pojana Maggiore
- Posina
- Pove del Grappa
- Pozzoleone
- Quinto Vicentino
- Recoaro Terme
- Roana
- Romano d'Ezzelino
- Rosà
- Rossano Veneto
- Rotzo
- Salcedo
- San Pietro Mussolino
- San Vito di Leguzzano
- Sandrigo
- Santorso
- Sarcedo
- Sarego
- Schiavon
- Schio
- Solagna
- Sossano
- Sovizzo
- Tezze sul Brenta
- Thiene
- Tonezza del Cimone
- Torrebelvicino
- Torri di Quartesolo
- Trissino
- Val Liona
- Valbrenta
- Valdagno
- Valdastico
- Valli del Pasubio
- Velo d'Astico
- Vicenza
- Villaga
- Villaverla
- Zanè
- Zermeghedo
- Zovencedo
- Zugliano
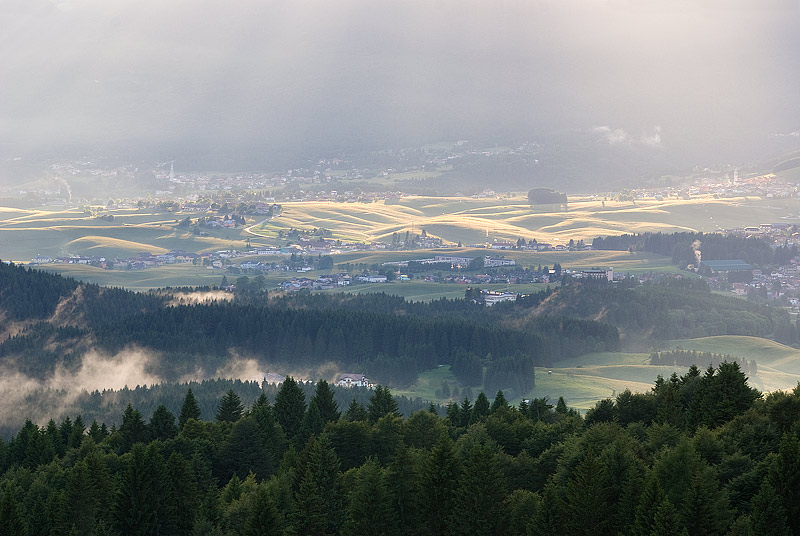
View of Sette Comuni

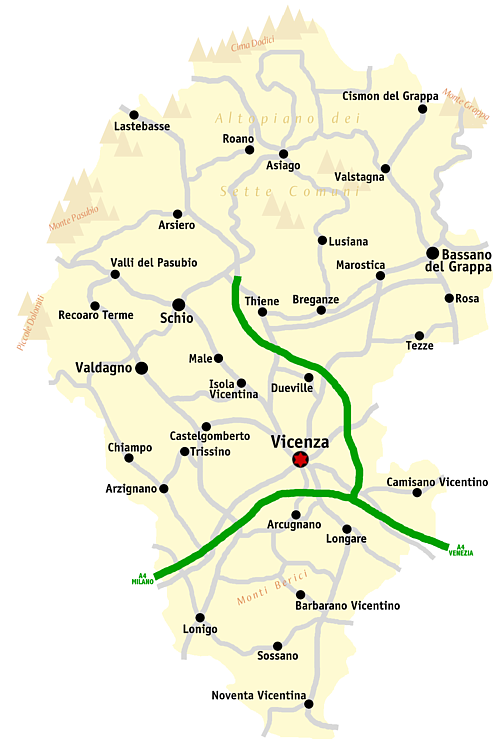
Towns and roads of the province

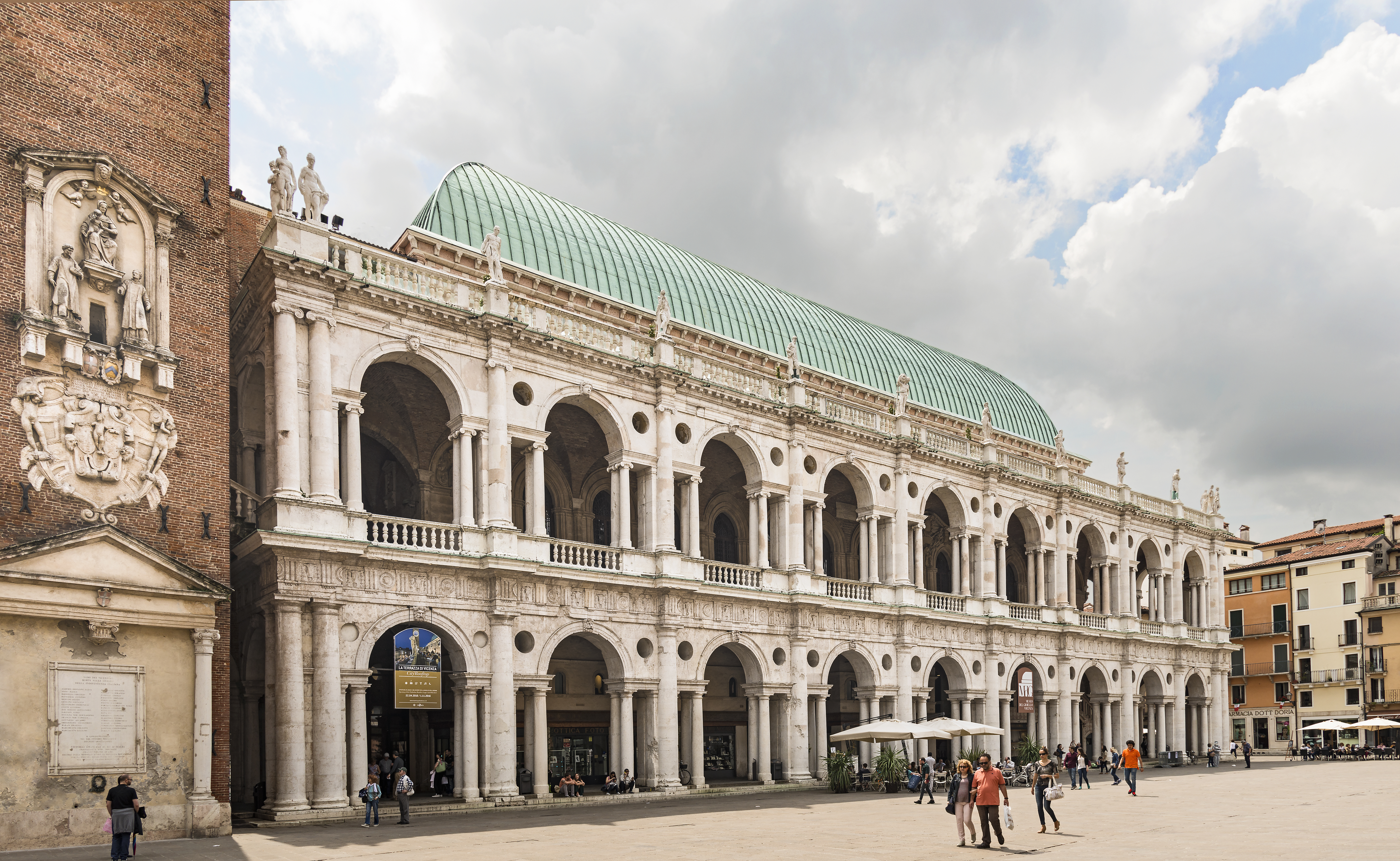
Vicenza

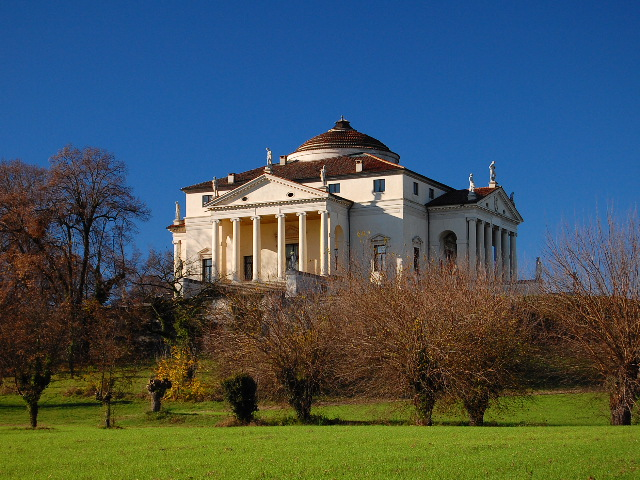
Villa Almerico Capra La Rotonda in Vicenza

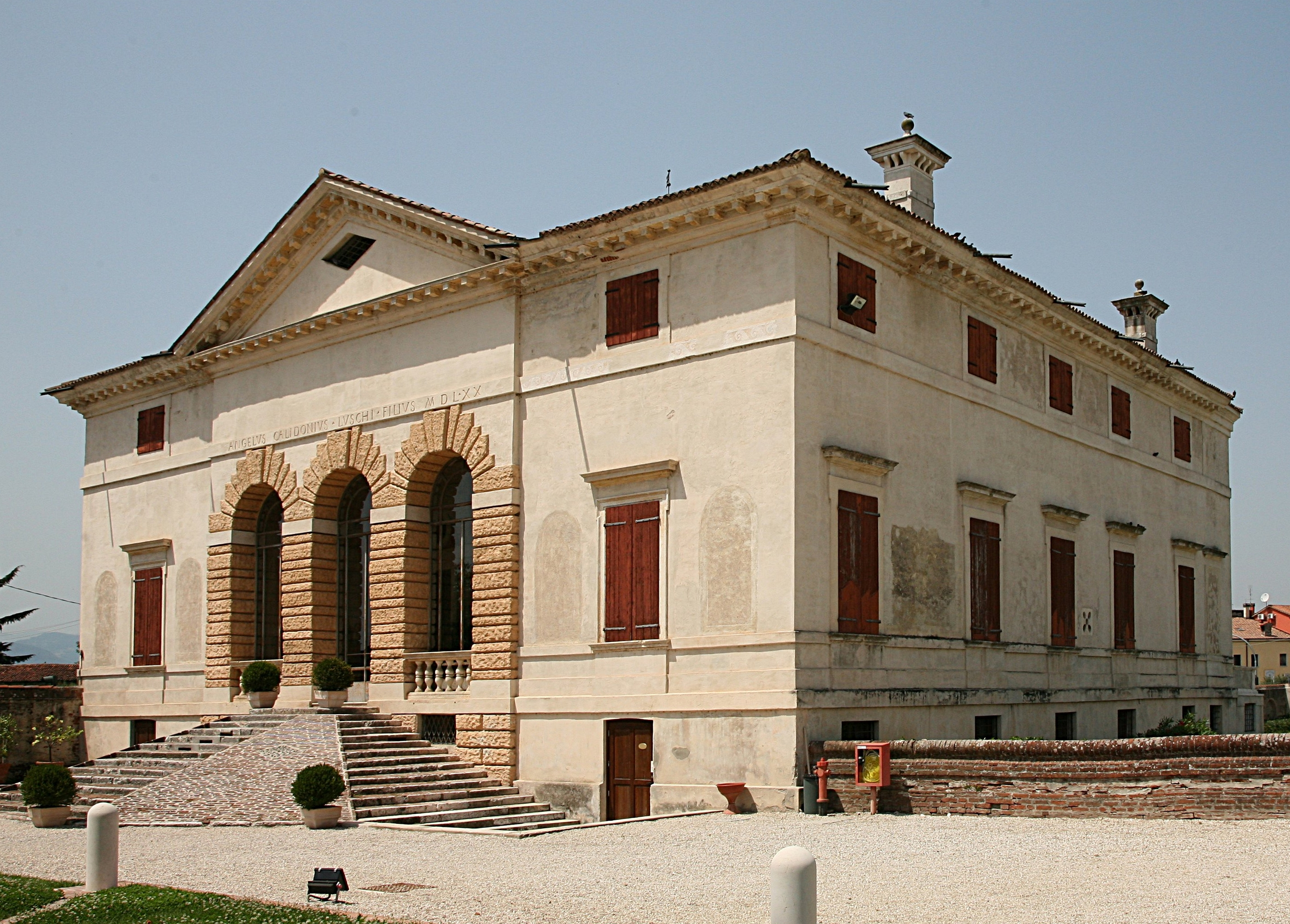
Villa Caldogno in Caldogno

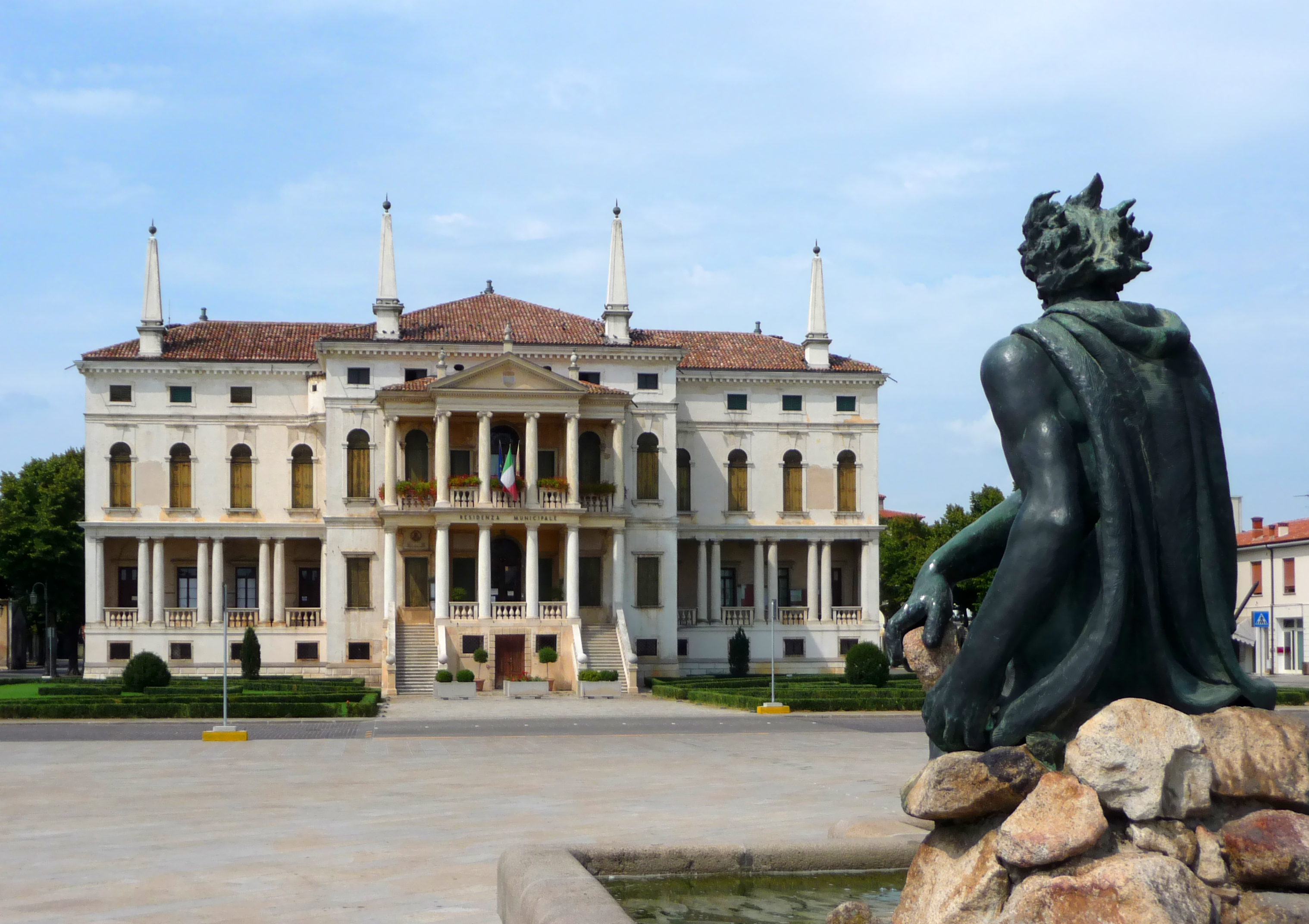
Villa Barbarigo in Noventa Vicentina

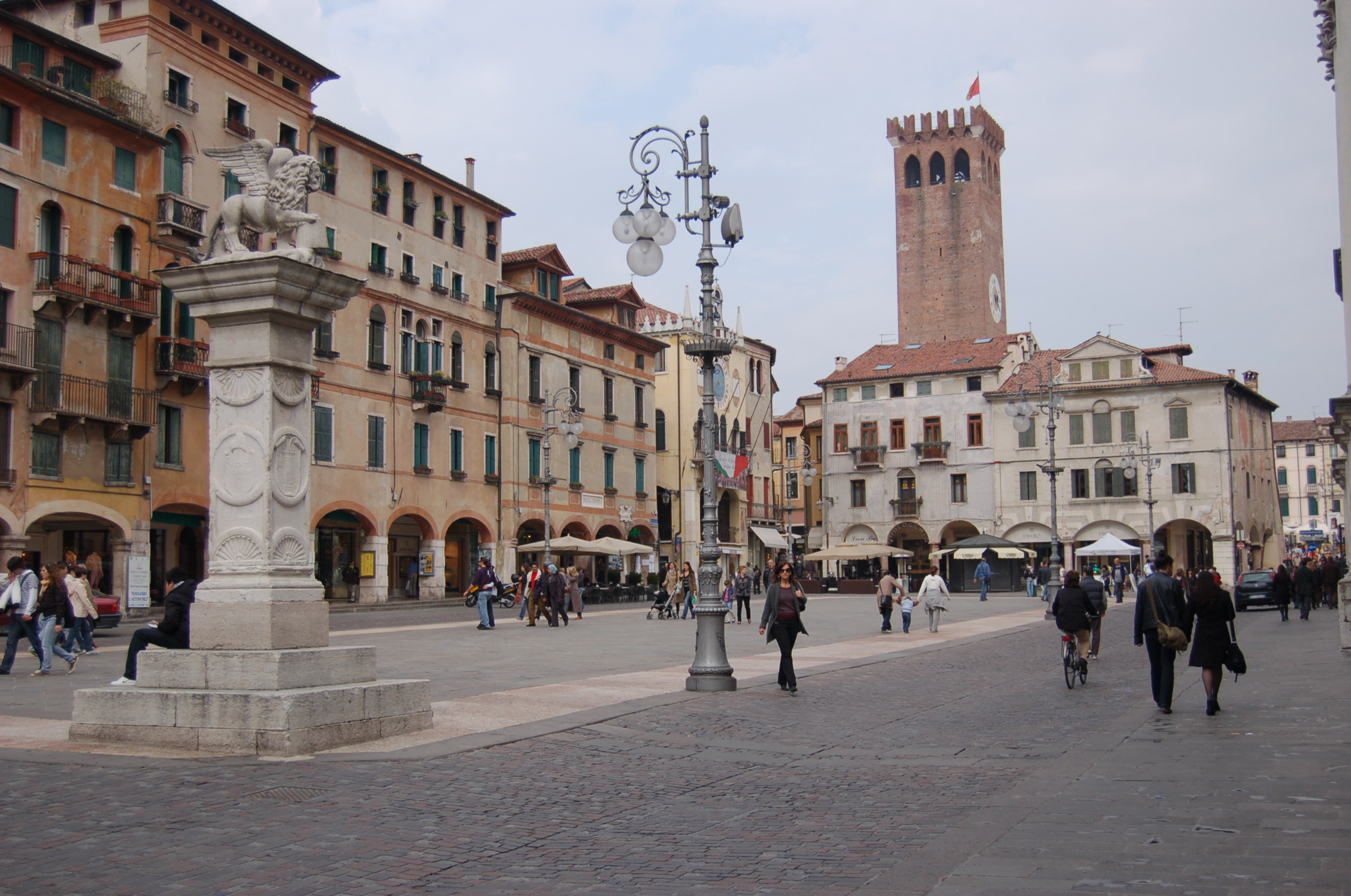
Bassano del Grappa

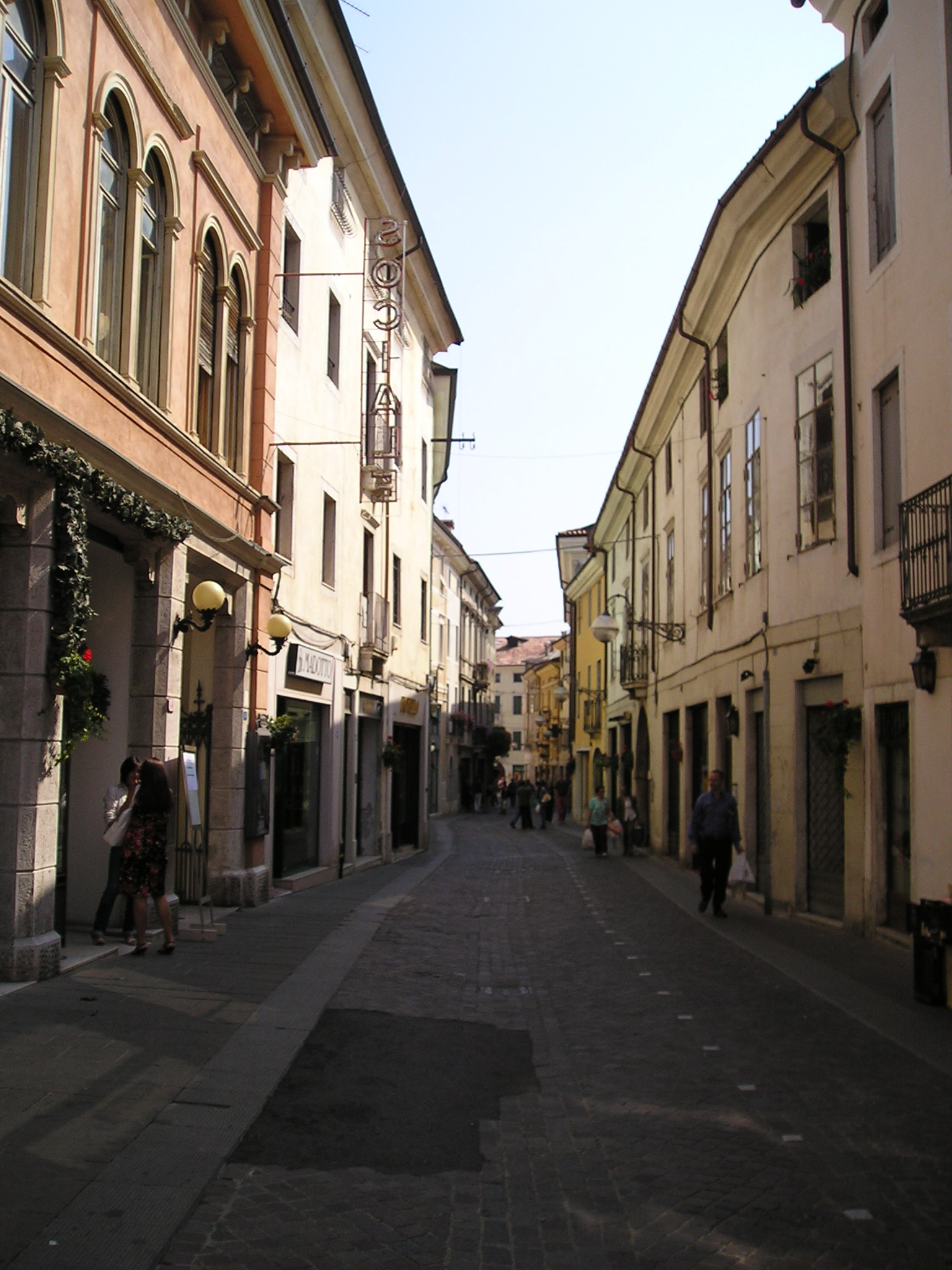
Schio

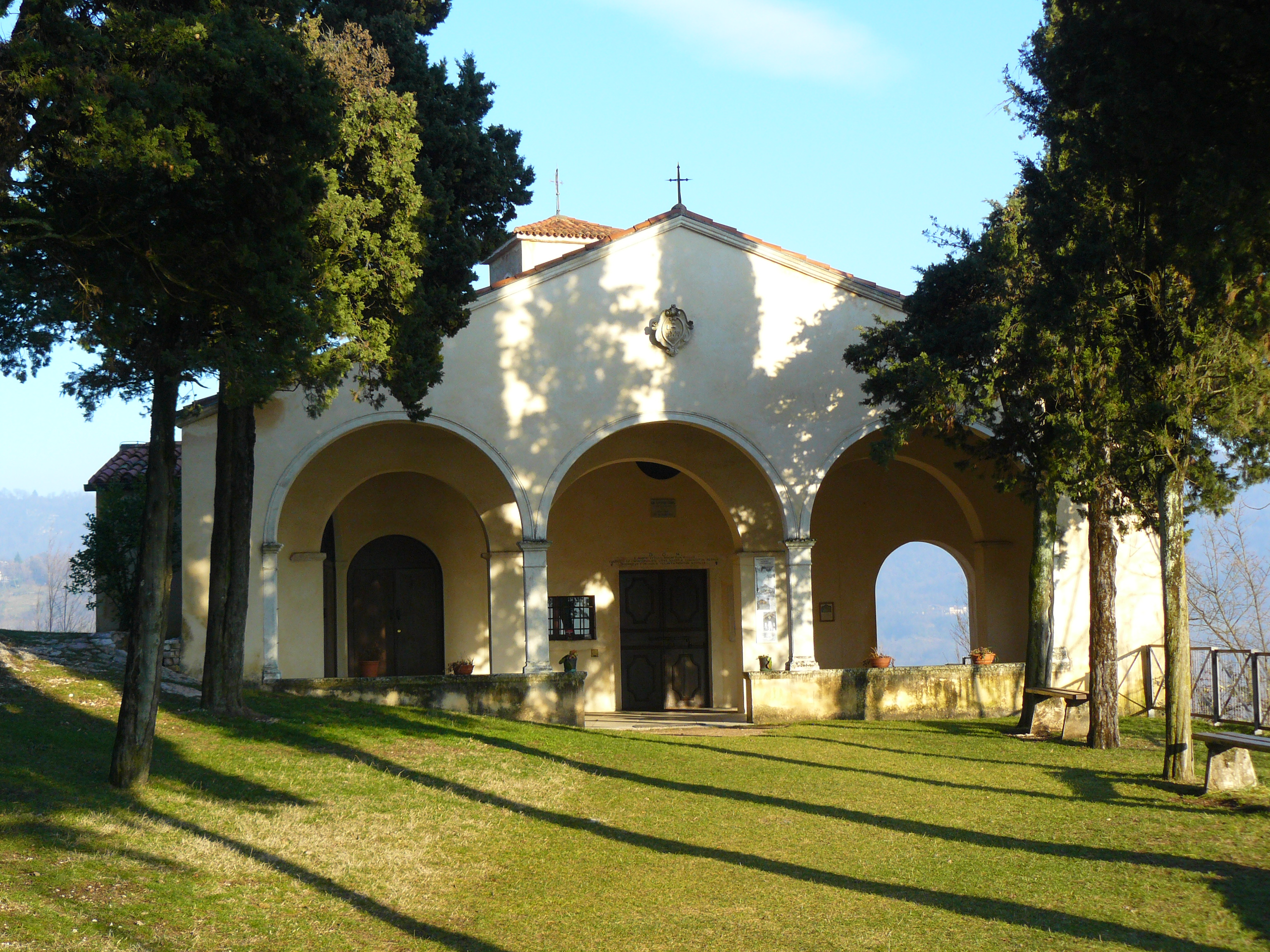
Valdagno

== Demographics ==
As of 2026, the population is 855,212, of which 49.7% are male, and 50.3% are female. Minors make up 14.9% of the population, and seniors make up 24.4%.

The population is unevenly spread throughout the province. More than 60% of the populace resides in densely industrialised areas in the eastern, western, and northern (known as Alto Vicentino) conurbations, as well as the area surrounding Bassano del Grappa. The remaining 40% reside in predominantly rural areas in the southern part of the province (the Colli Berici and Basso Vicentino) or the Asiago plateau.

Historical population

Year	Pop.	±%
1861	-	—
1871	366,224	—
1881	398,948	+8.9%
1901	450,181	+12.8%
1911	516,274	+14.7%
1921	560,676	+8.6%
1931	548,042	−2.3%
1936	559,375	+2.1%

Year	Pop.	±%
1951	608,002	+8.7%
1961	615,507	+1.2%
1971	677,884	+10.1%
1981	726,418	+7.2%
1991	747,957	+3.0%
2001	794,317	+6.2%
2011	859,205	+8.2%
2021	852,139	−0.8%

Source: ISTAT

=== Immigration ===
As of 2025, immigrants make up 13.8% of the population. The five largest foreign countries of birth are Romania, India, Serbia, Morocco, and Moldova.

=== Quality of life ===
According to the European Environment Agency, in 2023 Vicenza was the 362nd most polluted city in Europe (out of a sample of 375 cities) and the third in Italy, after the provinces of Cremona and Padua.

== Economy ==
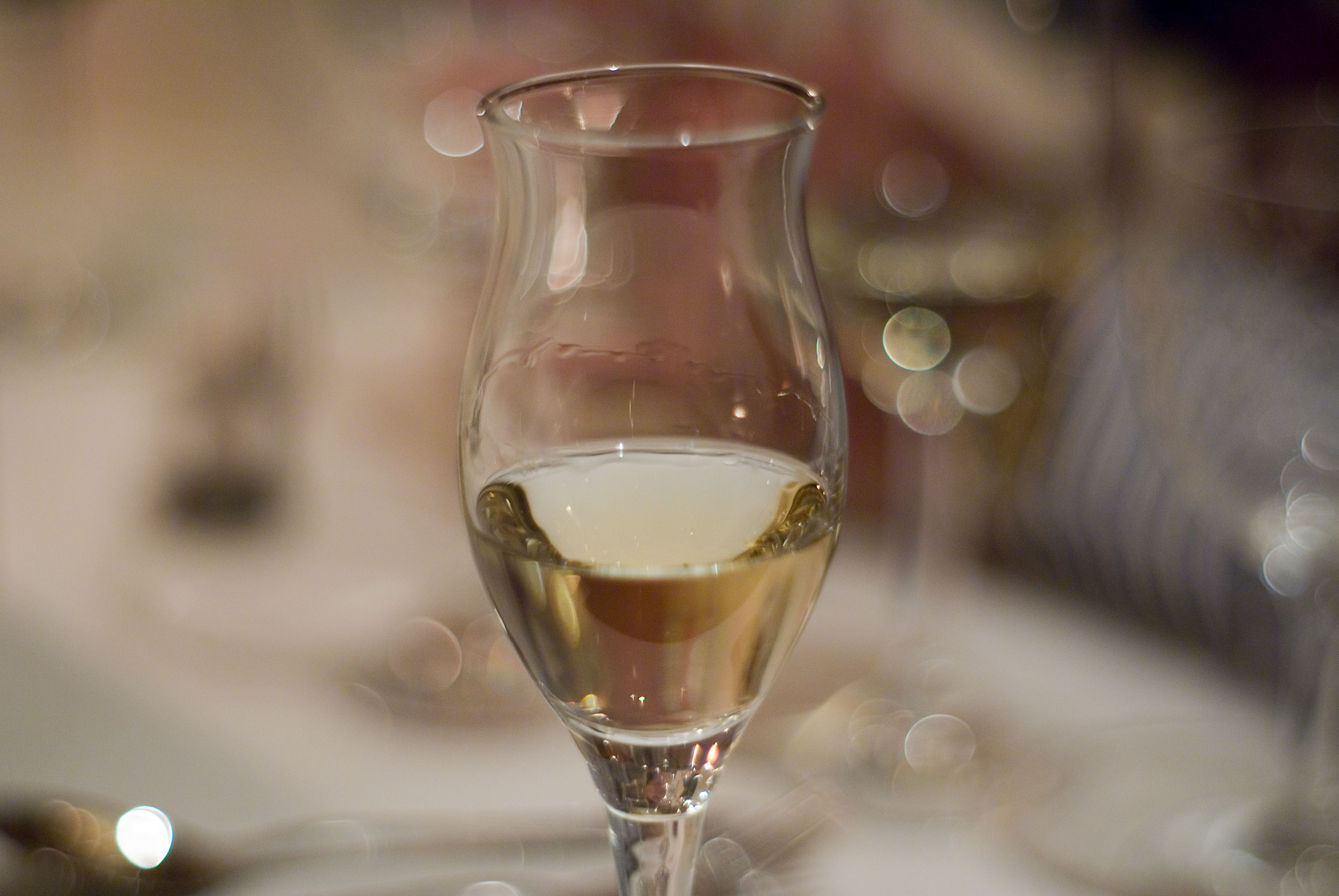
A glass of grappa

Economic development in some areas is hindered by industrial and agricultural depression. Towns in the western section such as Valdagno and Montecchio Maggiore suffer from high unemployment, following a decline in steel and textile industries. The Colli Berici and Basso Vicentino remain overwhelmingly agricultural and present high levels of unemployment. The heavily industrial Alto Vicentino area alone accounts for half of the province's GDP.

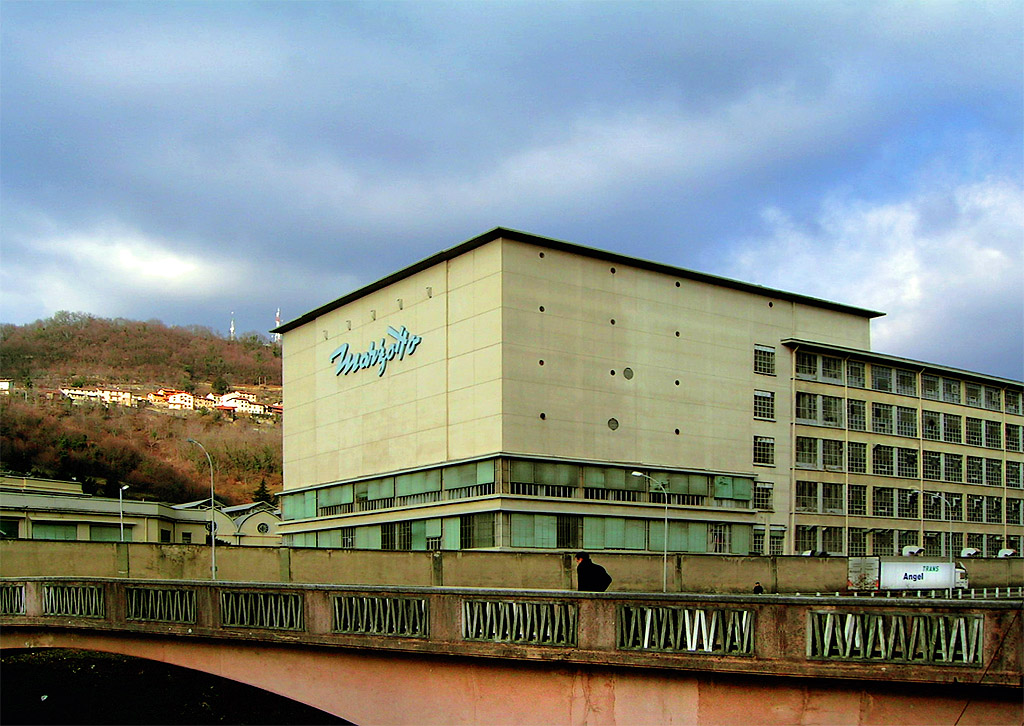
Marzotto headquarters in Valdagno

The industrial sector plays a primary role and over the last half century has supplanted the predominant agricultural sector: since the second post-war period, the province has in fact been one of the major interpreters of the remarkable economic and industrial development of the Northeast of Italy. The most important economic activities in the province are textile, tanning, marble extraction, ceramics, furniture, but above all jewelry.

Small and medium-sized enterprises predominate on the territory, making the province of Vicenza one of the most important on a national level, and which have developed, giving rise to mainly 4 industrial districts:

- The leather district in the Chiampo Valley, in Arzignano, Chiampo, Montorso Vicentino, Zermeghedo and Montebello Vicentino,
- The wool and yarn district in the towns of Schio and Valdagno (historically linked to the two large local industries, Lanerossi and Marzotto respectively)
- The goldsmith district in Vicenza, Trissino and Camisano Vicentino
- The electronics district in Vicenza

Other activities typically linked to the territory are:

- The distilleries in Bassano del Grappa, considered the world capital of grappa
- The furniture factories in Bassano del Grappa
- The production of ceramics in Nove and Vicenza

== Transport ==
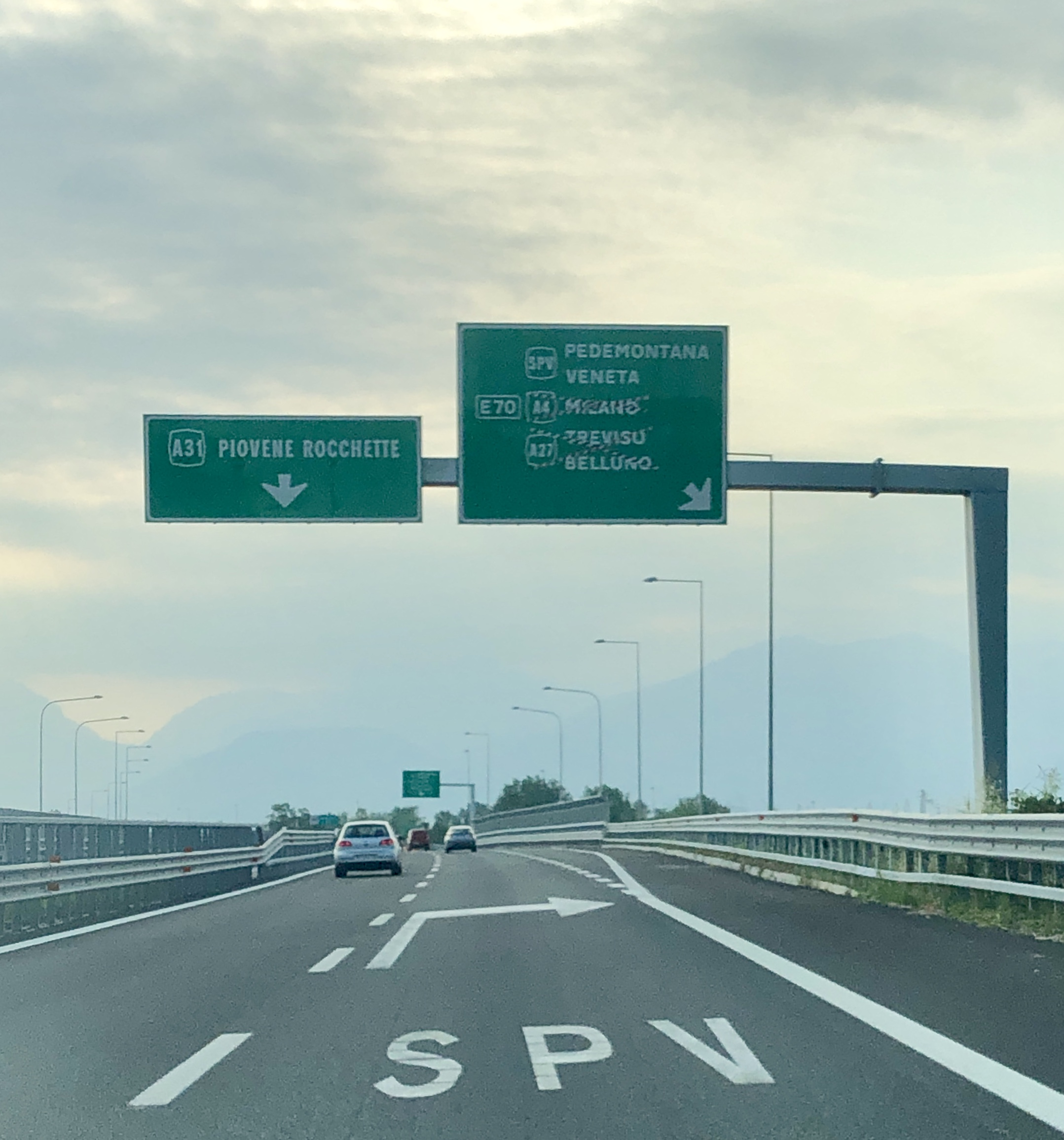
Autostrada A31 near Thiene

=== Motorways ===
- Autostrada A4: Turin-Trieste
- Autostrada A31: Badia Polesine-Piovene Rocchette
- Pedemontana Veneta: Montecchio Maggiore-Spresiano

=== Railway lines ===
- Milan–Venice railway
- Trento–Venice railway

== See also ==
- Calà del Sasso
- Strada delle 52 Gallerie
- Stele of Isola Vicentina
