= Barbarano Mossano =

- Comune
- Comune di Barbarano Mossano
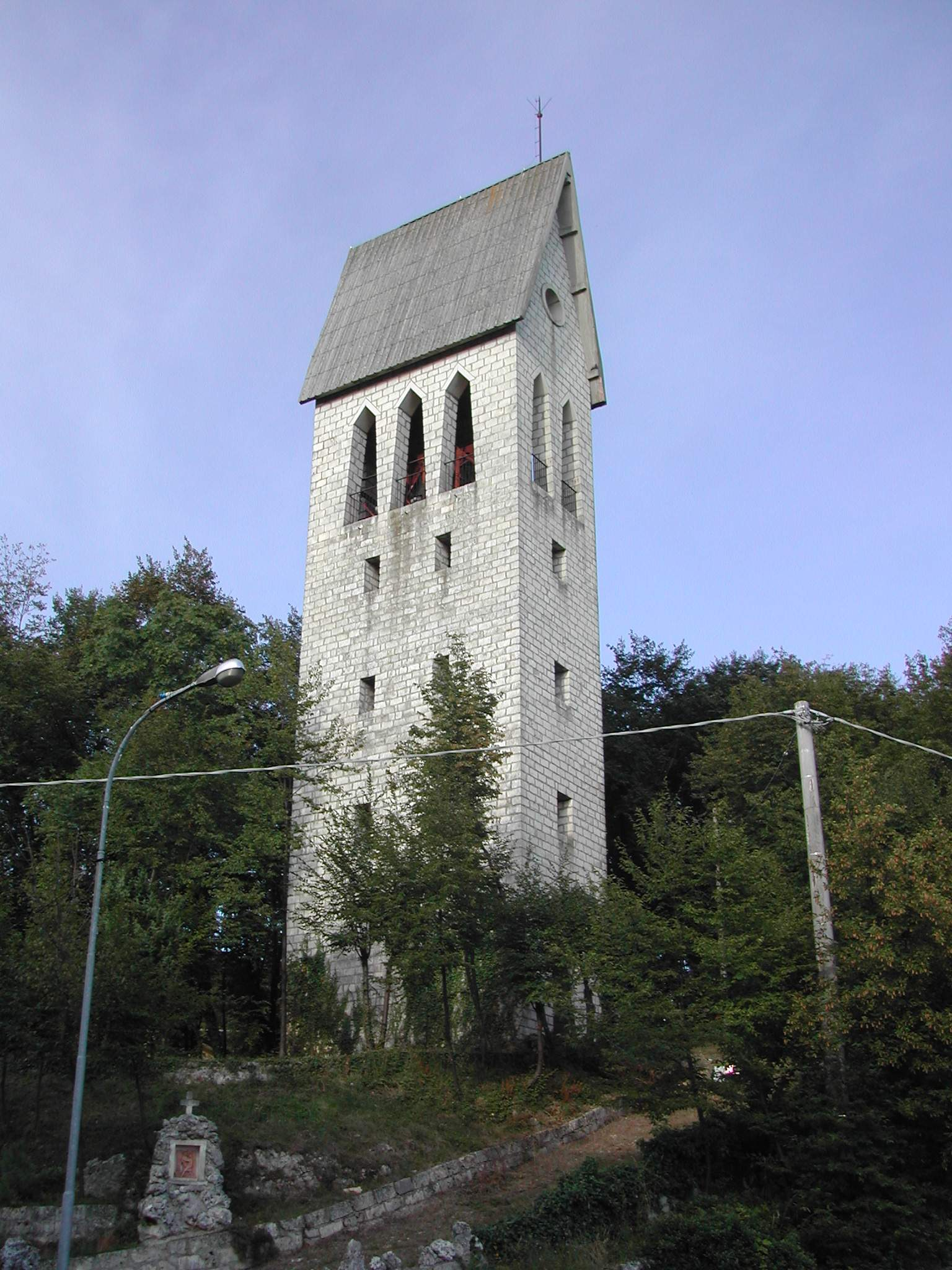
- Bell tower of San Giovanni in Monte

- Location within Italy Location within Veneto
- Coordinates: 45°25′N 11°32′E
- Country: Italy
- Region: Veneto
- Province: Vicenza (VI)

Government
  - Mayor: Cristiano Pretto

Area
  - Total: 33.486 km^{2} (12.929 sq mi)

Population (30 September 2017)
  - Total: 6,398
  - Density: 191.1/km^{2} (494.9/sq mi)
- Demonyms: Barbaranesi, Mossanesi
- Time zone: UTC+1 (CET)
  - Summer (DST): UTC+2 (CEST)
- Postal code: 42032
- Dialing code: 0522
- Website: Official website

Barbarano Mossano is a comune (municipality) in the Province of Vicenza in the Italian region Veneto.

It was established on 17 February 2018 by the merger of the municipalities of Barbarano Vicentino and Mossano.
