= Montegalda =

- Comune
- Comune di Montegalda
- Location within Italy Location within Veneto
- Coordinates: 45°27′N 11°41′E
- Country: Italy
- Region: Veneto
- Province: Vicenza (VI)
- Frazioni: Colzè

Government
  - Mayor: Andrea Nardin

Area
  - Total: 17 km^{2} (6.6 sq mi)
- Elevation: 28 m (92 ft)

Population (31 December 2015)
  - Total: 3,391
  - Density: 200/km^{2} (520/sq mi)
- Demonym: Montegaldesi
- Time zone: UTC+1 (CET)
  - Summer (DST): UTC+2 (CEST)
- Postal code: 36047
- Dialing code: 0444
- ISTAT code: 024064
- Website: Official website

Montegalda is a town in the province of Vicenza, Veneto, Italy. It is east of SP20.

It borders with the other commune of Montegaldella, separated by the Bacchiglione river.

Sights in Montegalda include the Castello Grimani-Sorlini, perched on top of a hill near the town centre and the only castle within a radius of 16 kilometres (10 mi); it is privately owned.
