= Fara Vicentino =

- Comune
- Comune di Fara Vicentino
- Location within Italy Location within Veneto
- Coordinates: 45°44′N 11°33′E
- Country: Italy
- Region: Veneto
- Province: Vicenza (VI)
- Frazioni: San Giorgio di Perlena

Area
  - Total: 15 km^{2} (5.8 sq mi)

Population (2018-01-01)
  - Total: 3,810
  - Density: 250/km^{2} (660/sq mi)
- Demonym: Faresi
- Time zone: UTC+1 (CET)
  - Summer (DST): UTC+2 (CEST)
- Postal code: 36030
- Dialing code: 0445
- ISTAT code: 024040
- Patron saint: San Bartolomeo Apostolo
- Saint day: 24 August
- Website: Official website

Fara Vicentino is a town in the province of Vicenza, Veneto, Italy. It is north of SP111.

== Sources ==
- (Google Maps)
