= Stele of Isola Vicentina =

4th century BC stele found in Isola Vicentina

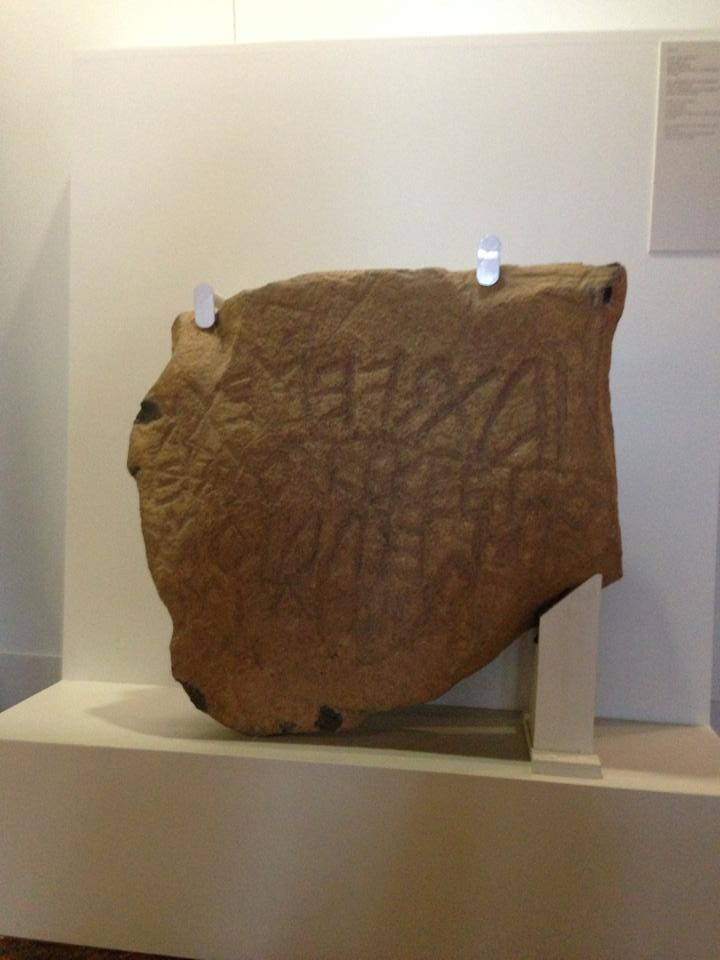
- Year: 4th century BC
- Location: Museo naturalistico archeologico di Vicenza, Vicenza

The stele of Isola Vicentina is an ancient prehistoric artefact found in the municipality of Isola Vicentina, Italy.

It is now exhibited in the Museo naturalistico archeologico di Vicenza.

== History ==
The ancient artefact, datable to the 4th century BC, was found in 1992 in the municipality of Isola Vicentina in the locality of Altura, during extraction works in a clay quarry. It was discovered by Ettorino Caldognetto.

The stele was delivered to the archaeological museum of the city of Vicenza, where the find was analysed. Since then, the stele has become a symbol of the museum, as well as one of the most important and most attractive pieces.

== Description ==
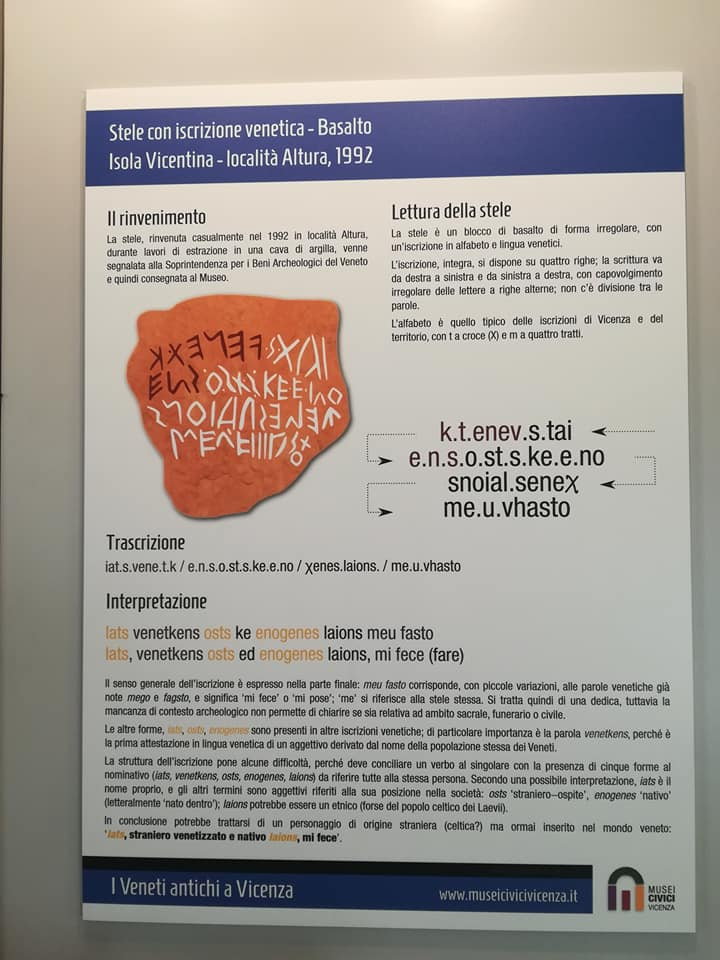
The description of the artefact

The stele is an irregularly shaped basalt stone slab with an inscription in the Venetic language and alphabet.

The inscription, complete, is arranged on four lines, the writing goes from right to left and from left to right with an irregular overturning of the letters in alternate lines; there is no division between words.

The alphabet is typical of Vicenza and its territory, with the cross T (X) and the M with four strokes.

IAT.S.VENE.T.K
E.N.S.O.ST.S.KE.E.NO
ZENES.LAIONS.
ME.U.VHASTO

In interpretative translation: IATS VENETKENS OST KE ENOGENENS LAIONS MEU FASTO.

The general meaning of the inscription is in the last part: meu fasto corresponds, with small variations, to the already known Venetian words mego and fagsto and means “made me”. The lack of an archaeological context does not allow us to clarify whether it is related to the sacral, funerary or civil context. Of particular importance is the word VENETKENS, because it is the first attestation ever in the Veneto of an adjective derived from the name of the ancient Venetians themselves.

The structure of the inscription poses some difficulties, because it must reconcile the verb in the singular with the presence of five forms in the nominative (iats, venetkens, osts, enogenes, laions) to refer all to the same person. According to one possible interpretation, Iats is the proper name, and the other terms are adjectives referring to his position in society. “Osts”, foreigner, guest, native “enogenes”, literally 'born inside', “laions” could be an ethnic group (perhaps from the Ligurian Laevi people).

"Iats, a Venetian foreigner, and a native of Laions, made me".
