= Barbarano Vicentino =

- Frazione
- Comune di Barbarano Vicentino
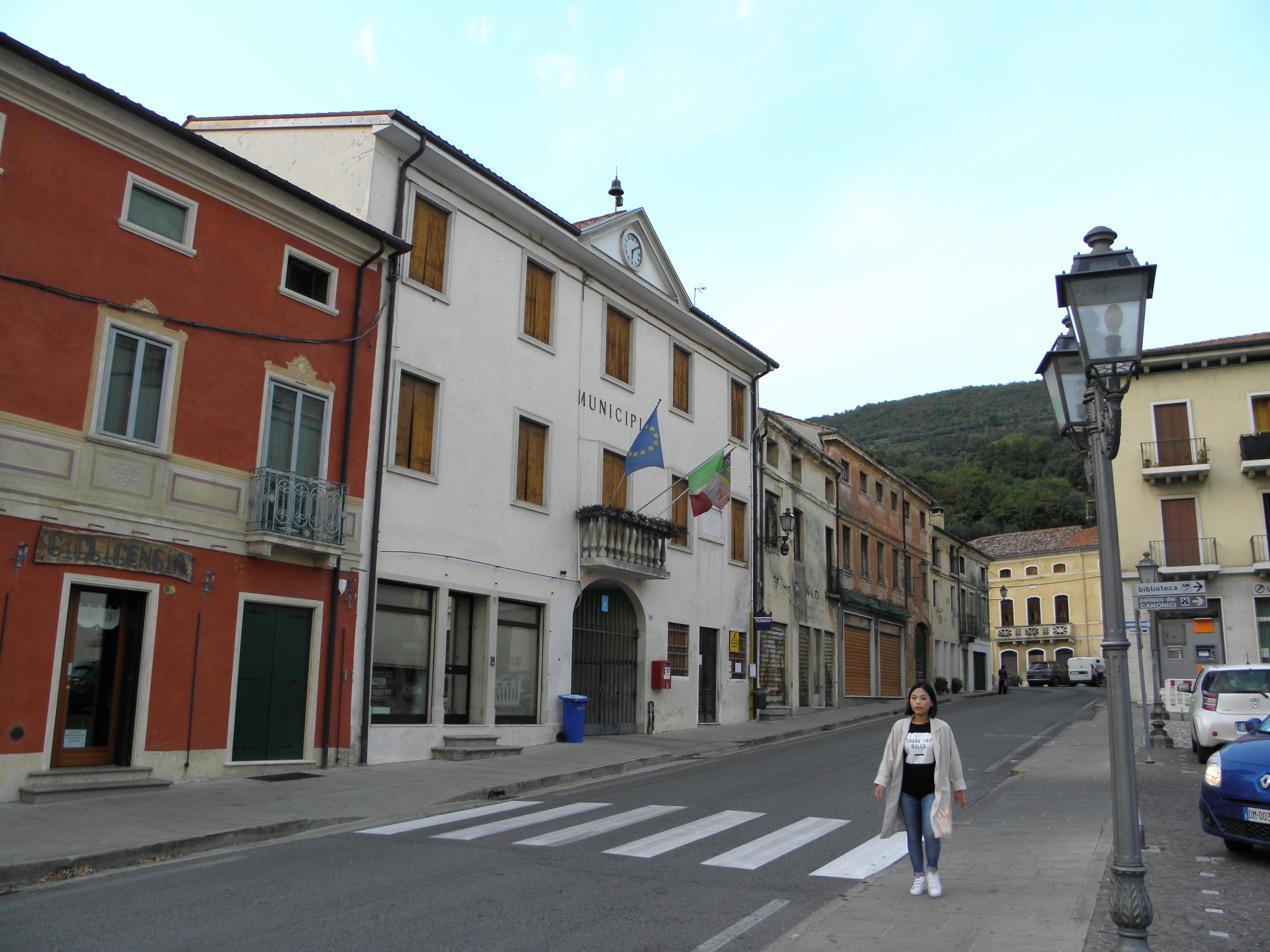
- Piazza Roma, Barbarano Vicentino

- Location of Barbarano Vicentino in Italy
- Coordinates: 45°25′N 11°32′E
- Country: Italy
- Region: Veneto
- Province: Vicenza (VI)
- Comune: Barbarano Mossano

Area
  - Total: 19.60 km^{2} (7.57 sq mi)
- Elevation: 151 m (495 ft)

Population (28 February 2007)
  - Total: 4,293
  - Density: 219.0/km^{2} (567.3/sq mi)
- Demonym: Barbaranesi
- Time zone: UTC+1 (CET)
  - Summer (DST): UTC+2 (CEST)
- Postal code: 36021
- Dialing code: 0444
- Website: Official website

Barbarano Vicentino is a frazione of the comune of Barbarano Mossano, in the province of Vicenza, Veneto, north-eastern Italy. It is northwest of SP8 provincial road.

== Sources ==
- (Google Maps)
