= Albettone =

- Comune
- Comune di Albettone
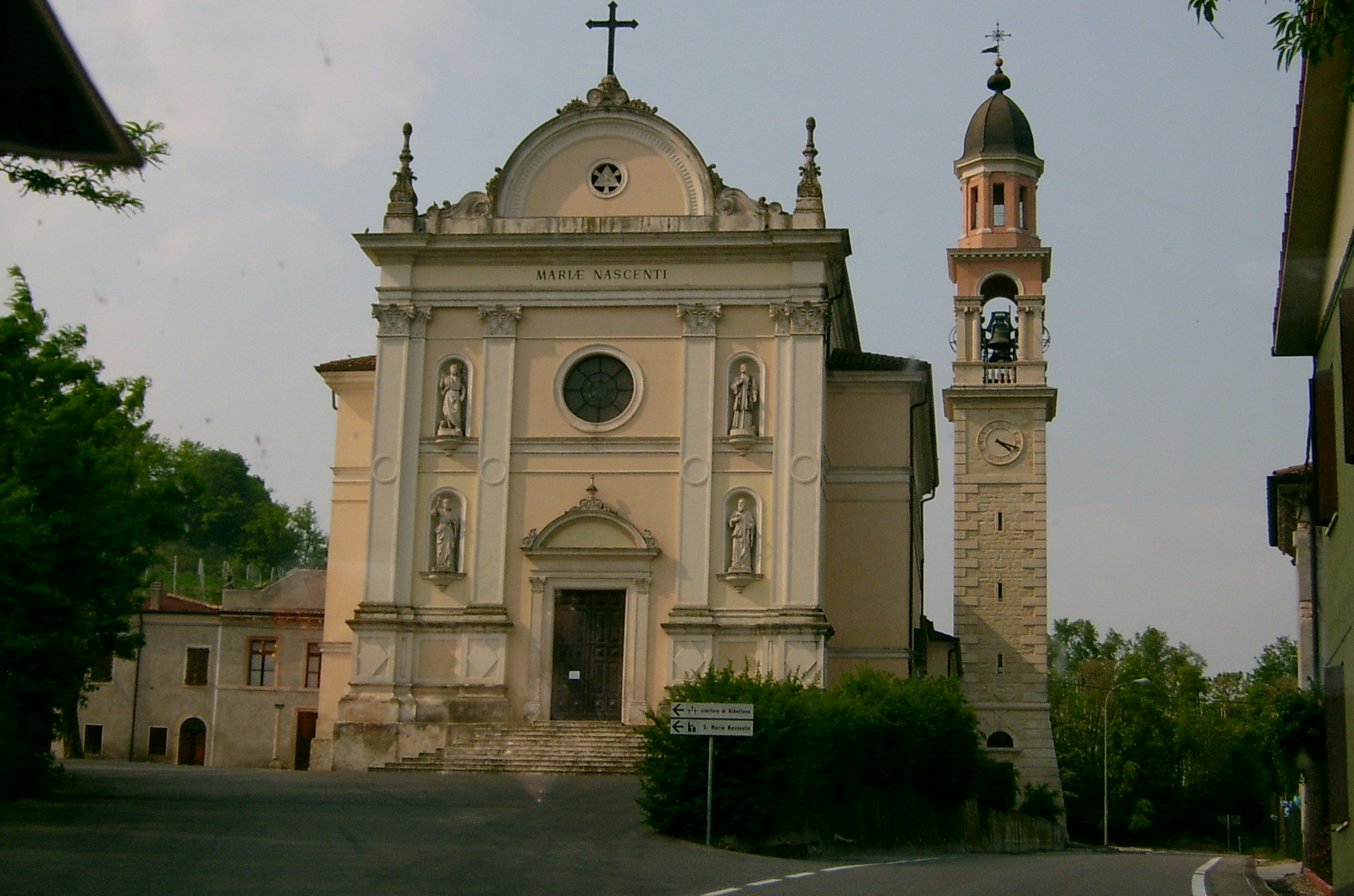
- Church of Santa Maria Nascente.

- Coat of arms

- Location of Albettone in Italy Albettone (Veneto)
- Coordinates: 45°22′N 11°35′E
- Country: Italy
- Region: Veneto
- Province: Vicenza (VI)
- Frazioni: Lovertino, Lovolo

Government
  - Mayor: Joe Formaggio

Area
  - Total: 20.21 km^{2} (7.80 sq mi)
- Elevation: 19 m (62 ft)

Population (30 April 2017)
  - Total: 2,044
  - Density: 101.1/km^{2} (261.9/sq mi)
- Demonym: Albettonesi
- Time zone: UTC+1 (CET)
  - Summer (DST): UTC+2 (CEST)
- Postal code: 36020
- Dialing code: 0444
- Website: Official website

Albettone is a town in the province of Vicenza, Veneto, north-eastern Italy. It is located east of road SP247.
