= Pozzoleone =

- Comune
- Comune di Pozzoleone
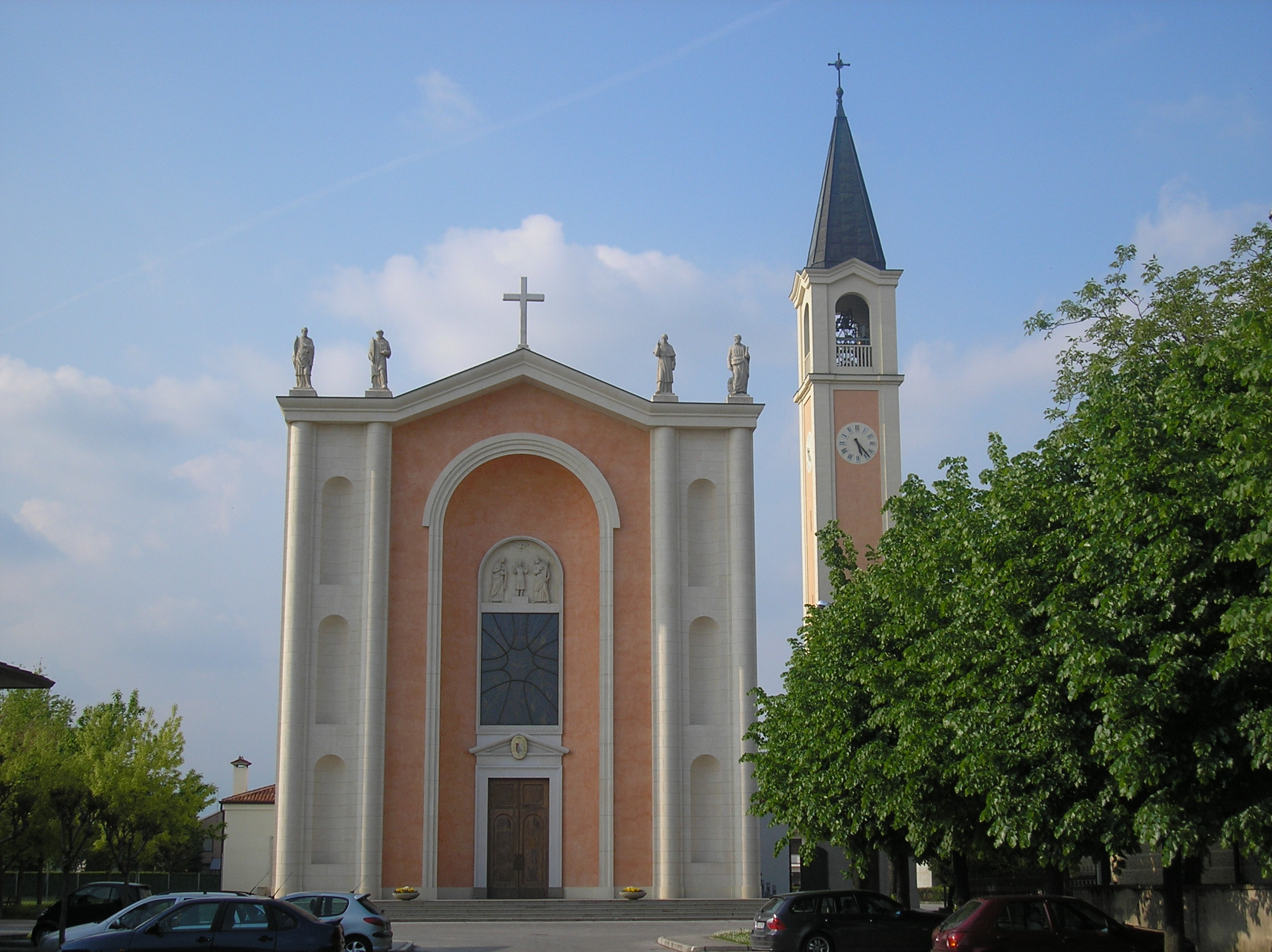
- Parish church of Pozzoleone

- Coat of arms

- Location within Italy Location within Veneto
- Coordinates: 45°38′58″N 11°40′28″E
- Country: Italy
- Region: Veneto
- Province: Vicenza (VI)
- Frazioni: Belvedere, Friola, Scaldaferro

Area
  - Total: 11.27 km^{2} (4.35 sq mi)
- Elevation: 56 m (184 ft)

Population (31 December 2015)
  - Total: 2,775
  - Density: 246.2/km^{2} (637.7/sq mi)
- Demonym: Pozzoleonesi
- Time zone: UTC+1 (CET)
  - Summer (DST): UTC+2 (CEST)
- Postal code: 36050
- Dialing code: 0444
- Patron saint: St. Valentine
- Saint day: 14 February
- Website: Official website

Pozzoleone is a town in the province of Vicenza, Veneto, north-eastern Italy. It is west of SP16 provincial road.

== Twin towns ==
Pozzoleone is twinned with:

- (Republic of Ireland) Ennistymon, Ireland
- Schimatari, Greece
