= Zugliano =

- Comune
- Comune di Zugliano
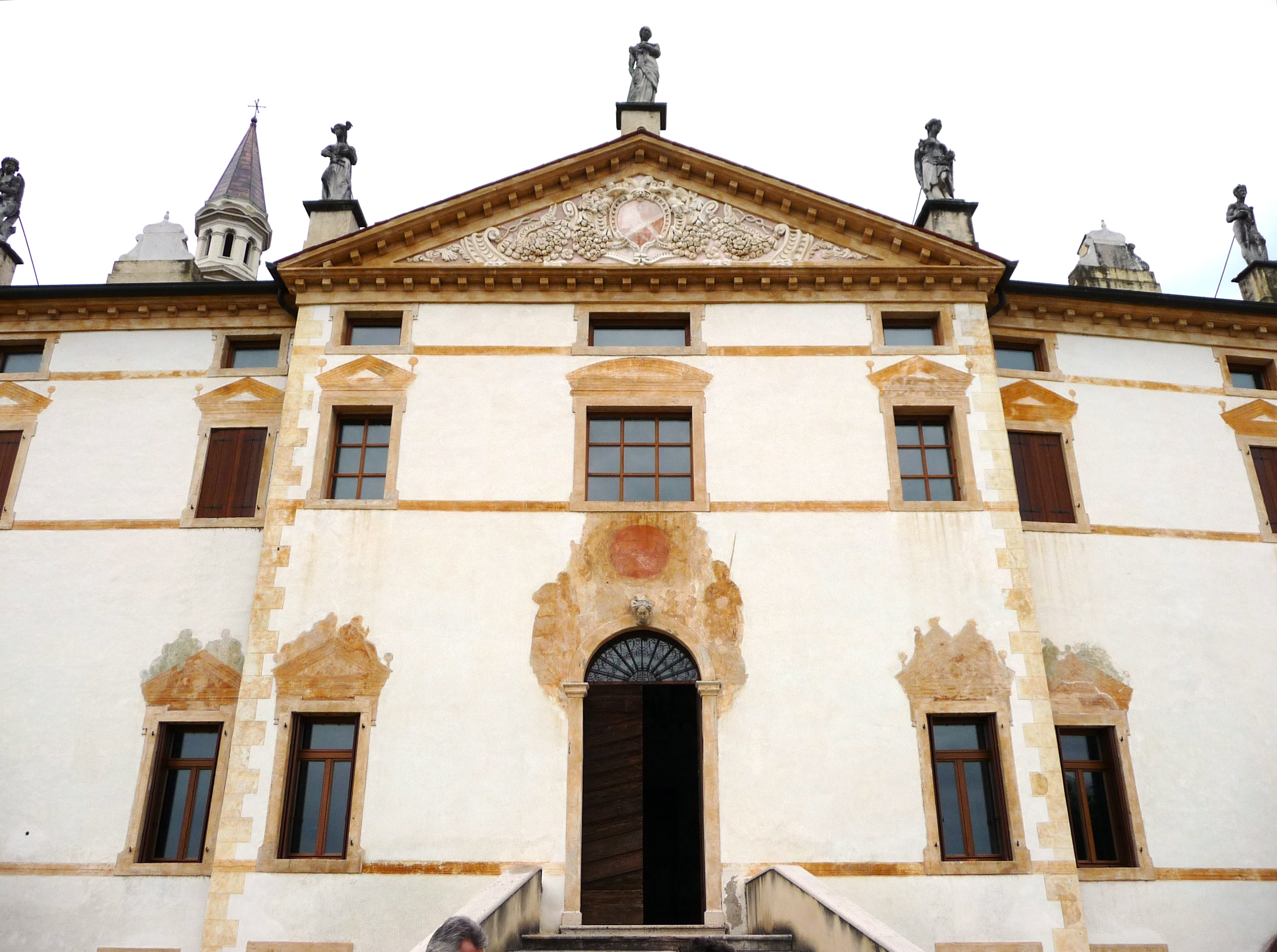
- Villa Giusti Suman, Zugliano

- Location within Italy Location within Veneto
- Coordinates: 45°43′N 11°31′E
- Country: Italy
- Region: Veneto
- Province: Vicenza (VI)
- Frazioni: Centrale, Grumolo Pedemonte

Government
  - Mayor: Sandro Maculan

Area
  - Total: 13 km^{2} (5.0 sq mi)
- Elevation: 154 m (505 ft)

Population (31 December 2015)
  - Total: 7,896
  - Density: 610/km^{2} (1,600/sq mi)
- Demonym: Zuglianesi
- Time zone: UTC+1 (CET)
  - Summer (DST): UTC+2 (CEST)
- Postal code: 36030
- Dialing code: 0445
- ISTAT code: 024122
- Patron saint: St. Zeno of Verona
- Saint day: 12 April
- Website: Official website

Zugliano is a town in the province of Vicenza, Veneto, Italy. It is north of SP111.

== Twin towns ==
- Agordo

== Sources ==
- (Google Maps)
