= Chiuppano =

- Comune
- Comune di Chiuppano
- Location within Italy Location within Veneto
- Coordinates: 45°46′N 11°28′E
- Country: Italy
- Region: Veneto
- Province: Vicenza (VI)
- Frazioni: Marola

Area
  - Total: 4 km^{2} (1.5 sq mi)
- Elevation: 230 m (750 ft)

Population (31 August 2008)
  - Total: 2,630
  - Density: 660/km^{2} (1,700/sq mi)
- Demonym: Chiuppanesi
- Time zone: UTC+1 (CET)
  - Summer (DST): UTC+2 (CEST)
- Postal code: 36010
- Dialing code: 0445
- ISTAT code: 024030
- Patron saint: San Michele Arcangelo
- Saint day: 29 September
- Website: Official website

Chiuppano is a town in the province of Vicenza, Veneto, Italy. It is east of SP349.

== Sources ==
- (Google Maps)
