= Montegaldella =

- Comune
- Comune di Montegaldella
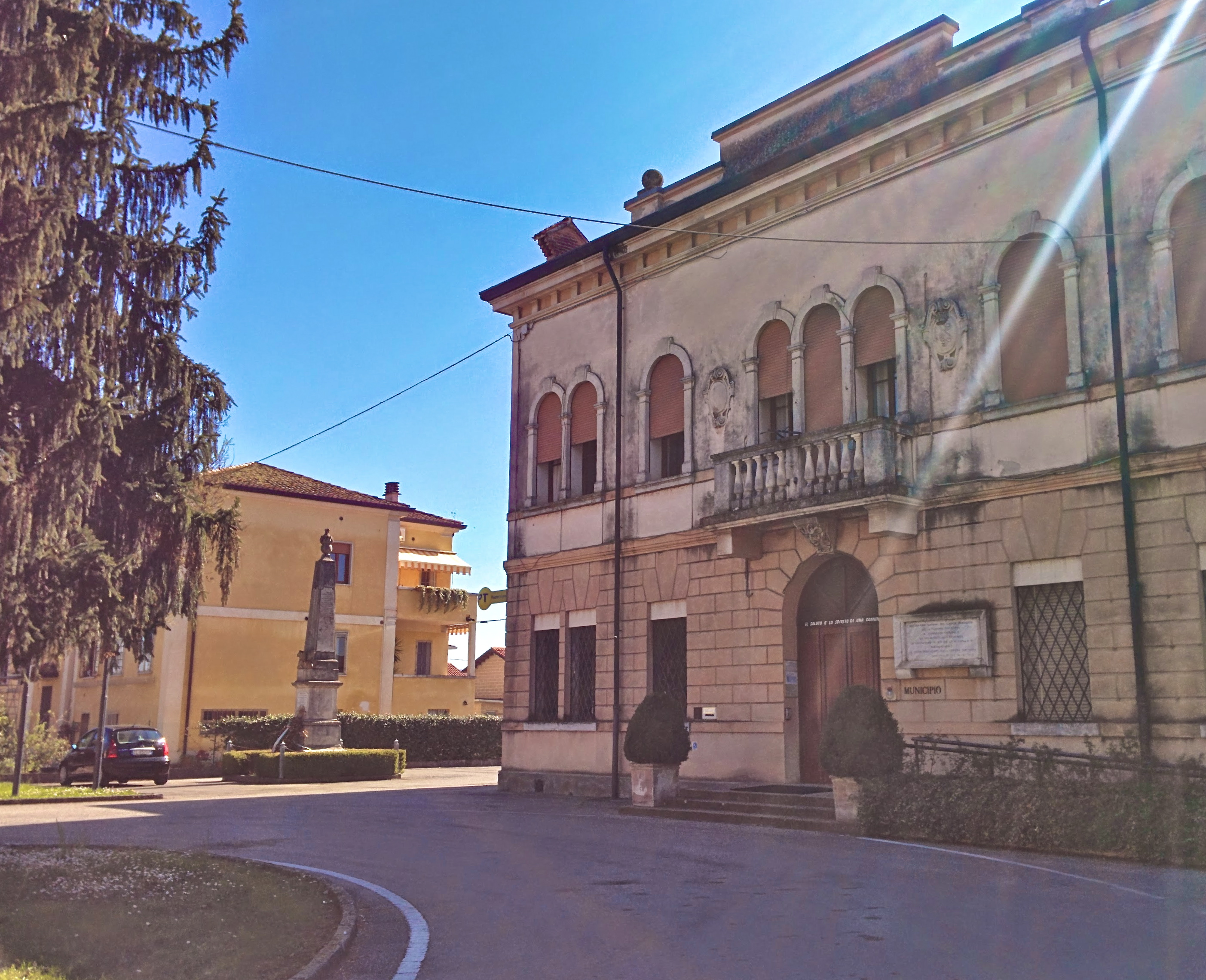
- Montegaldella Town Hall

- Location within Italy Location within Veneto
- Coordinates: 45°26′N 11°40′E
- Country: Italy
- Region: Veneto
- Province: Vicenza (VI)
- Frazioni: Ghizzole

Government
  - Mayor: Paolo Dainese

Area
  - Total: 13 km^{2} (5.0 sq mi)
- Elevation: 23 m (75 ft)

Population (30 November 2021)
  - Total: 1,809
  - Density: 140/km^{2} (360/sq mi)
- Demonym: Montegaldellesi
- Time zone: UTC+1 (CET)
  - Summer (DST): UTC+2 (CEST)
- Postal code: 36047
- Dialing code: 0444
- Website: Official website

Montegaldella is a city in the province of Vicenza, Veneto, northern Italy. The highway SP16 runs through the town.

== Main sights ==
The Villa Conti-Lampertico "La Deliziosa" (Delightful one) was built in the early 17th century; its garden features statues by Orazio Marinali. Like the nearby Montegalda, it is home to a castle.

San Michele Arcangelo is a 16th-century Roman Catholic church, restored in the early 2000s; the church's bells are still rung by hand by a team of citizens, who have also participated in bellringing contests.
