= Caldogno =

- Comune
- Comune di Caldogno
- Coat of arms

- Location within Italy Location within Veneto
- Coordinates: 45°36′00″N 11°29′40″E
- Country: Italy
- Region: Veneto
- Province: Vicenza (VI)
- Frazioni: Cresole, Rettorgole

Government
  - Mayor: Marcello Vezzaro

Area
  - Total: 15 km^{2} (5.8 sq mi)
- Elevation: 52 m (171 ft)

Population (31 December 2019).
  - Total: 11,337
  - Density: 760/km^{2} (2,000/sq mi)
- Demonym: Calidonensi
- Time zone: UTC+1 (CET)
  - Summer (DST): UTC+2 (CEST)
- Postal code: 36030
- Dialing code: 0444
- ISTAT code: 024018
- Patron saint: St. John the Baptist
- Saint day: 8 September
- Website: Official website

Caldogno is a town and comune near Vicenza in Italy. It has a population of 11,337 inhabitants.

The Villa Caldogno Nordera in its territory is attributed to architect Andrea Palladio.

It is the birthplace of the football player Roberto Baggio.

== Physical geography ==
Caldogno rises on a completely flat territory where the Timonchio river flows.

Caldogno borders:

- to the north and north-east with Villaverla;
- to the east with Dueville;
- to the south with Vicenza;
- to the south-west with Costabissara;
- to the north-west with Isola Vicentina.

== Origins of the name ==
=== Caldogno ===
In Roman times, Caldogno was the village located six miles away from the city and placed at the lower decumanus of the Vicentine Agro Centuriato of Thiene. For this reason, unlike other municipalities that have this particular location (such as Sesto San Giovanni in the province of Milan, but also Quarto d'Altino in Venice or Noventa Vicentina in Vicenza), it is strange that the name of the municipality is completely different or not derived from Sesto; many historians have tried to explain the etymology of the name.

First of all, the author Mantese considers it derived from "Carturnium": a purely philological analysis, however, would like that while the alternation of dental r > l could be accepted, the resulting alteration of vowels and consonants is rare to encounter in a single word.

The researcher Benetti connects it to "Calidarium", assuming that in the territory there were some hot springs or a hot bath establishment. However, there are two criticisms that can be made against this hypothesis, given the lack of evidence about the existence of such a place. The first one is that baths were usually designed to be in a city, not in a small agricultural village. Secondly, Caldogno was probably the seat of springs that fed the Roman aqueduct and therefore it must have been a place provided with fresh water springs rather than hot ones.

The researcher Dani states instead that the name comes from the Latin noun "calleu", mangling of "valleus" (vallis), adjective form of calloneus that would mean "valley area". In addition to the fact that Caldogno does not rise in a valley, it should also be considered the high number of modifications that the name would have undergone to get to the current.

Pendin, on the other hand, argues that the change of name from Sesto is to be found in some events that occurred after the Roman era. In the history of Caldogno there are two other possible hypotheses, both to be traced back to the Longobard period:

- the name could come from the Germanic adjective "kalt", linked to the fact that clear and cold water came out of the springs, which then became "Caldonus" according to the normal alternation of the two dental consonants D-T;
- the name could come from "aldiones" that indicated the semi-free peasants in the Longobard era. This word, if pronounced with a slight aspiration, can be transformed into Haldiones, becoming by metathesis Caldonius, signifying the whole "village of semi-free peasants" to separate them from the serfs.

=== Cresole ===
Olivieri, a great scholar of the toponymy of the region, assures a Latin origin linked to the name of the ancient owner "Cresius", who first built, in the area overlooking the banks of the Bacchiglione, the huts that constitute the first residential nucleus.

Pendin explains how the name could derive from "cretulae", a species of marsh reeds present in the area originally marshy.

=== Rettorgole ===
Both Formenton and Olivieri agree that the name of the hamlet derives from "rivus turgulus", “rivo o fiumicello torbido” for the appearance the water had when flowed into the various streams. Already in an act of 1499 the area of Rettorgole is called "villa de Roturgule".

== Monuments and places of interest ==
=== Religious architecture ===
- Church of San Giovanni Battista, church of the parish of Caldogno. As evidenced by the discovery made in the early seventies during the arrangement of the heating system, the church has undergone several reconstructions throughout history. Dating is difficult since there are no graffiti or decorative elements and the bricks with which the walls are made are both well-shaped and squared (index of a florid period) and rough and mixed clay (typical instead of poorer periods), although it is certainly before the little church of San Michele, whose origin seems to date back to the second half of the seventh century. The lowest level, in fact, corresponds to the fifth century and had the apse to the east; the next level is from the sixth century and the upper one from the tenth century. During the XVI and XVII centuries it was modified several times until 1648, when it was totally rebuilt. The work led to the reconstruction of the high altar and the purchase of the tabernacle, still present today, with the two angels on the sides and two other smaller ones that have been lost. The facade was rebuilt buying the five statues still present today. The church was damaged during the Napoleonic raids, giving way to the church built in 1818. The present structure originates from the central nave, built in 1818, which was the church of that time and was enlarged in the first half of the 20th century by a design of Ferruccio Cattaneo. The structure was often modified during the 20th century both to expand and restore it, especially after the Friuli earthquake in 1976. In 1990 a new pavement was laid, which brought to the same level the three naves designed by Cattaneo in the early twentieth century. Inside there is the tomb containing the bones of Felice Ponso, parish priest of Caldogno from 1901 to 1908. The entire ceiling of the nave is painted with a series of four frescoes representing four important stages in the life of the patron saint Saint John the Baptist. Near the entrance there is the annunciation to Zacharias of the birth of his son, in the centre of the nave is depicted the birth, in the third panel the figure of John the Baptist and above the presbytery the image of the banquet during which Salomè received on a silver tray the head of the one who blamed her and her mother for the sins committed: John the Baptist. The author of this work, in 1839, seems to be Giuseppe Poppini of Schio whose signature, however, is present only in the last box. In the baptistery there is a canvas depicting the Baptism of Christ by Giuseppe Poppini.
- Church of Sant'Urbano. The church of Sant'Urbano is the parish church of Cresole, hamlet of Caldogno. It has existed since 1185, the year in which the confirmation of the officiation of the Canons of Vicenza by Bishop Pistore took place and became a parish in 1444. The first rebuilding of the walls took place in 1656 and at the time it was officiated by the parish priest and a chaplain who, as a collaborator, could use a house that became property of the church in 1829. In 1797 a third altar was restored and added. As early as 1901, the first expenses for the expansion works began to appear in the church's accounting register, but they were officially carried out between 1906 and 1907. The designer was Gerardo Marchioro and the inauguration took place on 11 August 1907 in presence of Monsignor De Marchi. A further restoration took place in 1994. The church has a facade facing south and is built with a predominantly neoclassical style. The church clearly has three naves with four side altars: one from the eighteenth century dedicated to the Saints Gaetano and Lucia with a canvas by Giobatta Stefani dated 1843, one with the marble statue of "Our Lady of the Rosary" of 1944 and the two on the right built in the nineties dedicated to Saint Anthony and Our Lady. Bruno Vedovato painted two frescoes for this church: one on the ceiling depicting the transfiguration of Jesus and one above the front door with the sermon on the mountain. The altarpiece of the high altar seems to be attributed to Agostino Bottazzi who painted it in the middle of the nineteenth century with the representation of Saint Urban dressed as a pontiff with Saint Lucia and two soldiers in chain, his brothers Valerian and Maximus.

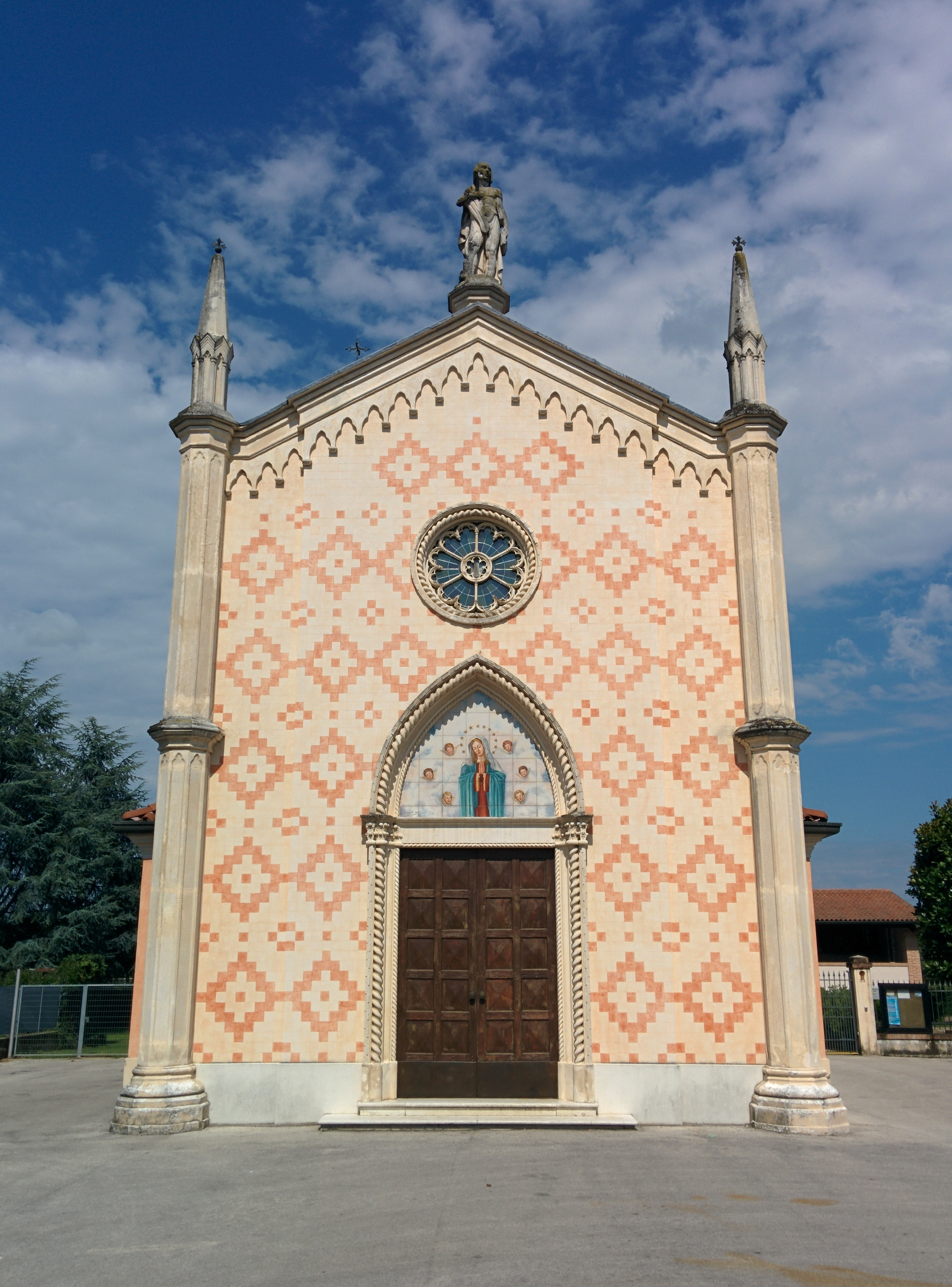
Church of San Bartolomeo in Rettorgole

- Church of San Bartolomeo, parish church of Rettorgole, hamlet of Caldogno. The first church built on the site probably dates back to the eleventh century and was built in the north-south direction. After being stripped of property and partially demolished by a certain Francesco Milano who recovered the bricks to build his home, it was demolished to leave room for an eighteenth-century church of which the two side altars were inherited. The church was rebuilt respecting the pre-existing structures in the years 1888–89, with a neo-Gothic structure inspired by the Florentine churches of the fourteenth century and with an appearance not very dissimilar to that of today. In 1898 the church was enlarged by adding a fourth arch to the nave, thus expanding the facade to the north.

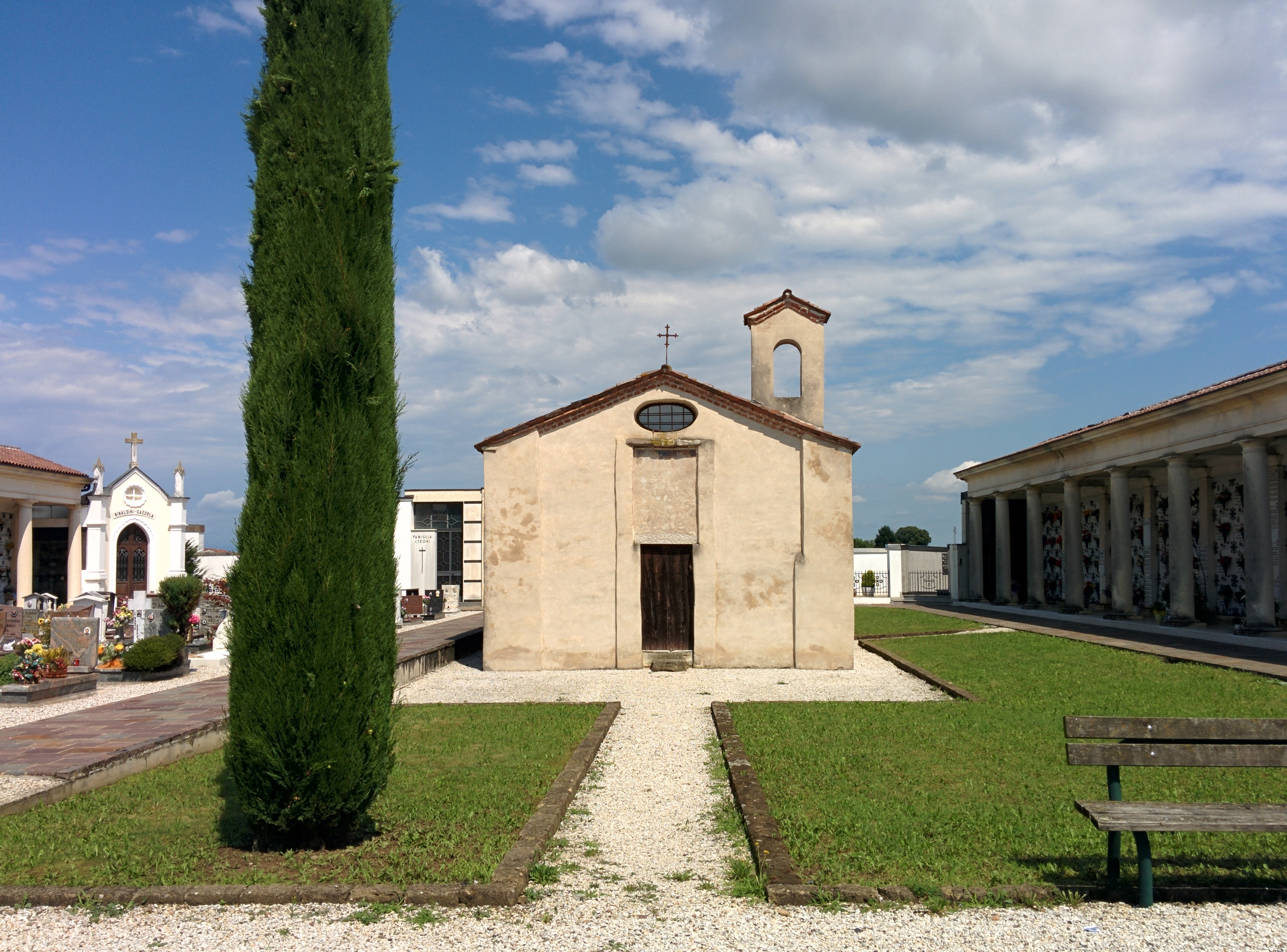
Church of San Michele

- Church of San Michele, or Longobard church, is the church of the cemetery of Caldogno. The church was almost certainly built in the Lombard era, as evidenced by the lintel above the main entrance. During the centuries it has suffered countless destructions that have definitely changed the original appearance leaving only the original materials, which have been recycled for remaking. In 1927 the podestà wanted it to be shot down. The apse towards the east, denotes early Christian features. Built with various materials, ranging from rough bricks to small stone cubes tied by layers of abundant mortar, it presents numerous inaccuracies in the structure, typical of that era. Originally it was not close to the cemetery, which was built around the church later to move it from the church of San Giovanni Battista, the current parish church. On the outside and inside there are frescoes of the fourteenth century, now very faded, representing figures very dear to the Longobard tradition: Saint Martin of Tours, Christ, the Virgin and Saint Agatha.
- Church of the Motherhood of Mary. The little church of the Motherhood of Mary is a small oratory once attached, through the rustic structures housing the stables, to the Villa Fogazzaro-Arnaldi. There is no record of its origin or its first uses. Maccà recalls how, at the beginning of the nineteenth century, it was unofficial and belonged to the Nanti family, then Fogazzaro and later the Arnaldi became its owners. During the First World War, the soldiers took possession of both structures: in particular they desecrated the church to turn it into a prison and defaced the walls with inscriptions and more. After the religious association San Raffaele Arcangelo took away almost all the sacred furnishings, the church was deconsecrated and used as a warehouse until 1954. In that year, the restoration works were carried out by volunteers who brought the church back to religious use. The statue of the Virgin Help of Christians, not originally from the church, was donated in this period by a group of Salesians in the country. The design of the facade was carried out during a restoration in 1972.
- Little church of Sant'Antonio. It is an oratory located in the municipality of Caldogno, but is part of the nearby parish of Novoledo, fraction of Villaverla. At the time of its construction, the church was located under the parish of Caldogno and was dedicated to San Domenico, but in 1874 it was aggregated to the parish of Novoledo and changed the titular saint to Sant'Antonio. Initially, it was built as a noble chapel for the Ghellini family in the second half of the seventeenth century. When the parish of Novoledo bought the church in 1927, it immediately gave way to restoration work followed by new interventions in 1978.

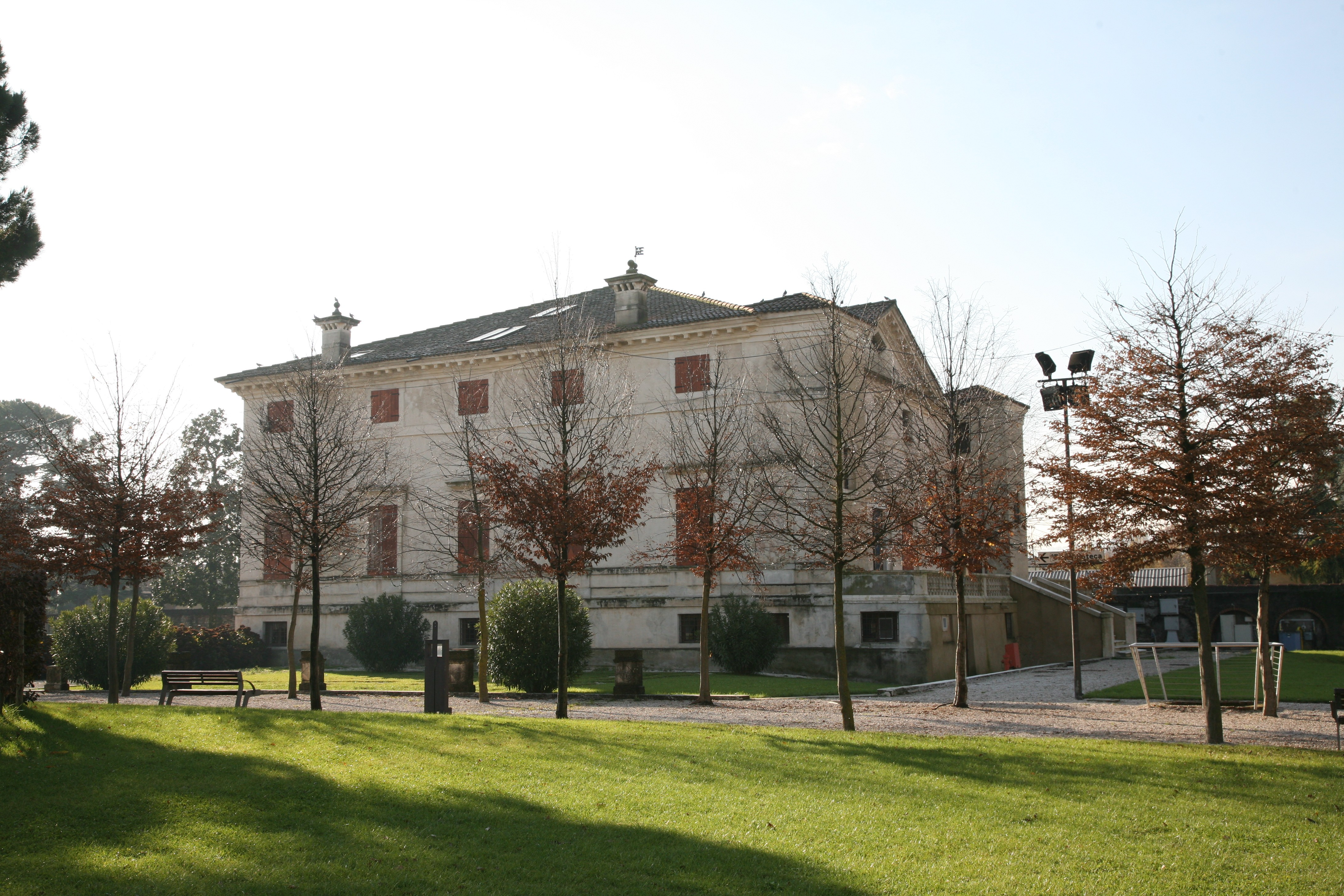
Villa Caldogno

=== Civil architecture ===
- Villa Caldogno. The main monument of Caldogno is a Palladian villa that is included in the list of UNESCO World Heritage Sites.
- Old town hall. The former town hall in Piazza Bruno Viola, commonly called "old town hall", is one of the residences that belonged to the Counts Caldogno. In reality, this structure is not the original residence of the nobles on this side of the country since the whole structure remodelled several times in the west side in the seventeenth century and that led to the loss of its original appearance. In the fourteenth century a structure was built whose southern facade possessed a large porch with four arches dominated by large windows: of these, only one of the arches and the keystones remains of the other three. Located in the town centre, it was built towards the end of the sixteenth century when an unknown branch of the family had the initiative. It is currently owned by the municipality and the possibility of selling or restoring is under discussion.

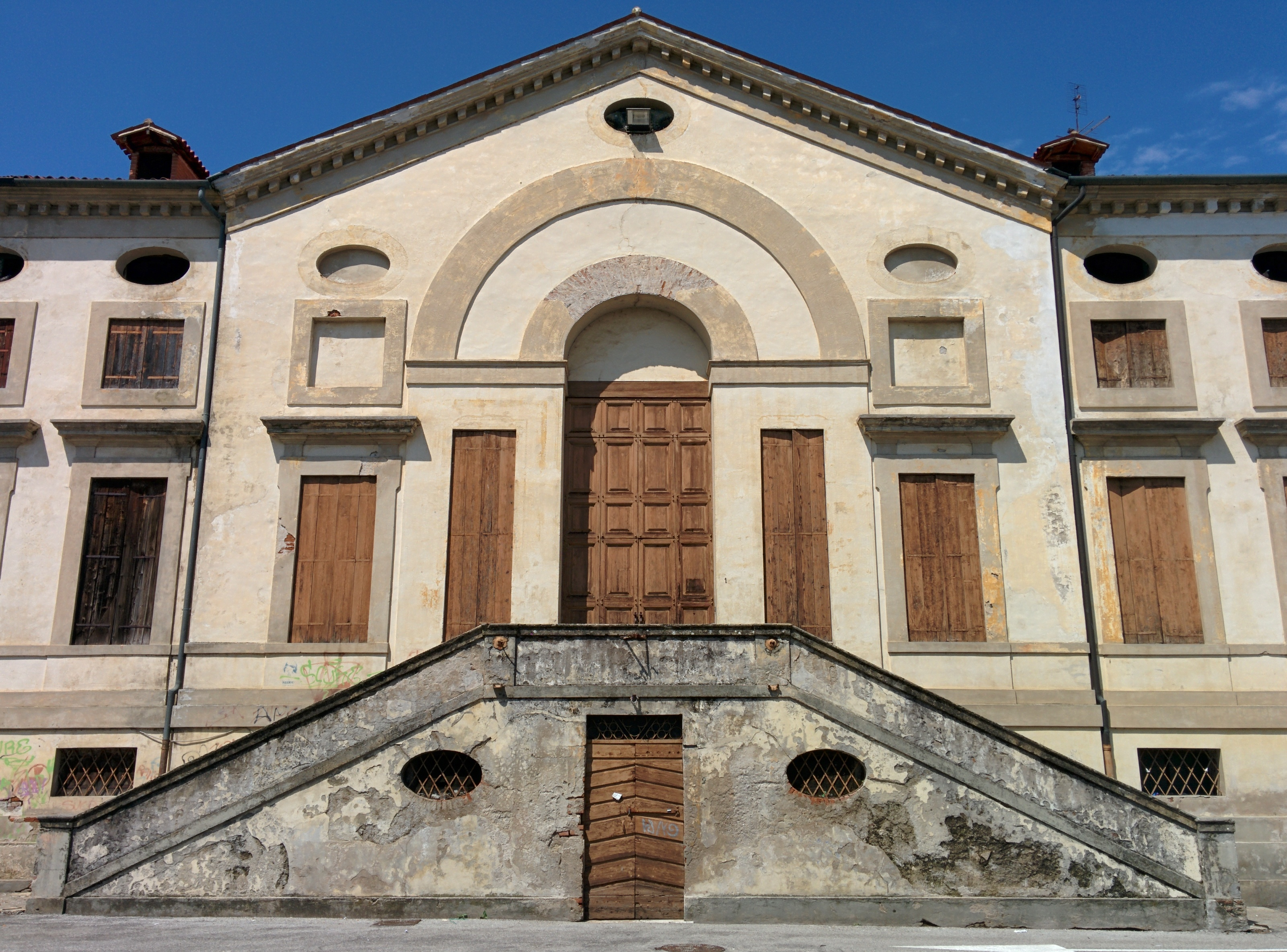
The former town hall – piazza Bruno Viola

- Villa Todescato is a residence that was built in 1534 by Michele Caldogno while renovating the castle of Caldogno. The history of this structure is intimately linked to that of the Castle itself. The presence of a castle in Caldogno is easily explained by its optimal position for controlling the roads that led to the Val Leogra and Val d'Astico, the origin of the Roman aqueduct, and the proximity to the city of Vicenza. It is therefore clear how, in the documents of the early fourteenth century, an existing and ancient castle is mentioned. Shortly after the year 1000, it became an episcopal castle and certainly the first feudal lord was a count of Caldogno. In 1313 it was completely destroyed by the Paduan raids, but, immediately rebuilt: it was already fully operational in the fourteenth and fifteenth centuries. In 1534 it was completely renovated by Michele Caldogno, who completely changed the appearance of fortress preferring the current appearance on a project, most likely, by Giandomenico Scamozzi. After this remodelling, the fortress chapter ceases for the building to begin that of country residence, although under the plaster the walls of the castle still remain. Recent restorations have further erased the traces of the ancient structure. Also the dovecote and defense systems, described by ancient documents (including moat and drawbridge), have disappeared. The front door opens into a wall that has many exposed bricks that come out in the areas where the plaster has fallen. The walls of the north and south elevations are enclosed by a cornice that is slightly higher than the sloping roof. On the two other sides, instead, there is a saw-tooth frame, an indication of its belonging at least to the fifteenth century. After Caldogno, it belonged to Pagello and from 1920 to Todescato.

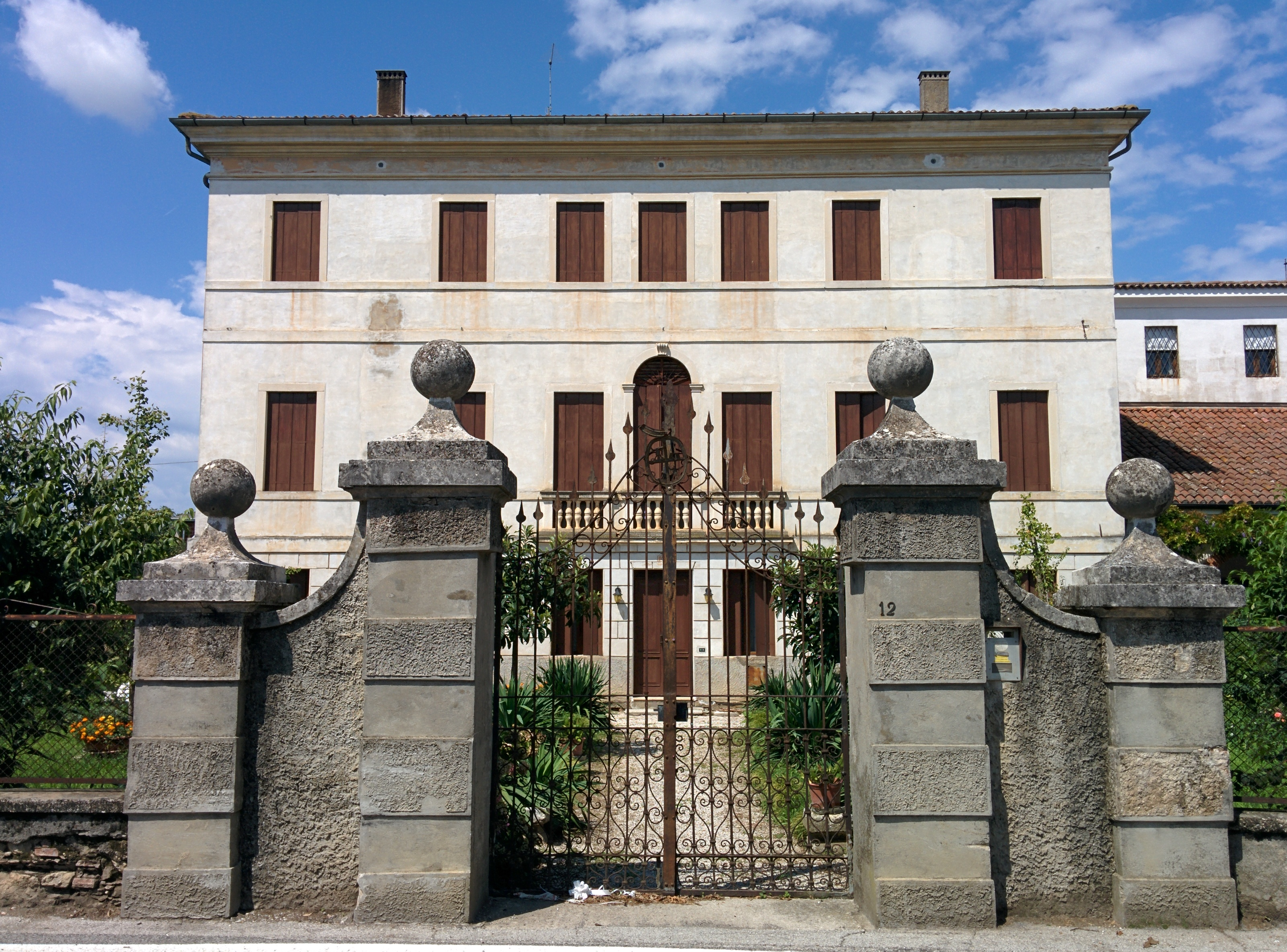
Villa Fogazzaro-Arnaldi

- Villa Fogazzaro-Arnaldi is a residence in the style of 18th century Venetian villas used as a summer residence for a long time by the writer from Vicenza Antonio Fogazzaro. Probably based on an earlier dwelling of the second half of the seventeenth century, the villa was once part of a residential complex consisting of stables and rustic environments partly demolished that, one close to the other, joined the little church of the Motherhood of Mary, not far away. According to Maccà, it originally belonged to the Nanti, then passed to Valmarana, Fogazzaro and finally to Arnaldi. During the First World War the villa and the adjoining church were seized by the militaries, who damaged them. The structure of the villa is set on a square plan, whose main facade is facing south. All the compositional elements are rigidly symmetrical and with a density that is growing towards the axis of symmetry. The interiors have been tampered several times, but still remain on the typical structure of the Venetian villas, with large central hall that receives light from the facades on which open symmetrical side rooms. The noble floor has higher rooms and is rich of joineries.
- Villa Ghellini-Piovene was a residence in street Scartezzini, a district of Novoledo under the municipality of Caldogno. Since the Middle Ages, the Ghellini family had a residence in this area, but it was only in the mid-seventeenth century that it was restored by Count Giovanni Battista Ghellini, making it a very characteristic holiday resort in the eighteenth century. The villa, however, has a short life: in the twentieth century it was divided into several owners and each restructured to adapt it to their needs by losing all the ancient splendour of the building. Attached to the villa is the church of Sant'Antonio, now under the parish church of Novoledo.
- Villa Curti is a residential complex located in Rettorgole. Probably built by a local master builder at the end of the 19th century, it is very similar to the Post-palladian villas: the facade is symmetrical and divided into three sectors (one central slightly advanced and two lateral), originally without the typical pediment, but with the same ledge for the three parts. A triangular tympanum was added to the central sector with the restoration of the late 1990s. It has a southern elevation very wide. The right wing communicates with a three-storey structure, but smaller, which is connected to a seventeenth-century barchessa consisting of eight columns and two pillars at the end that derive, then, nine intercolumns. Inside, the typical organization of the Venetian villas is respected, with a large central hall that gives on two elevations and doors that give to the side rooms.
- Villa Floriani-Pagani is a residence in Rettorgole, a hamlet of Caldogno. Hosting the elementary school of Rettorgole, it was bought by Antonio Pagani in 1973, who restructured it. The structure has a main facade facing east typical of Venetian villas, with a central main sector and two symmetrical wings slightly falling. On the pediment are three statues representing Jupiter in the centre, Hercules and a female figure on the sides. It was built by the Floriani family in 1713, as can be read in the plate: «The brothers Giovanni, Flaminio and Angelo Floriani erected from the foundations in the year of the Lord 1713»

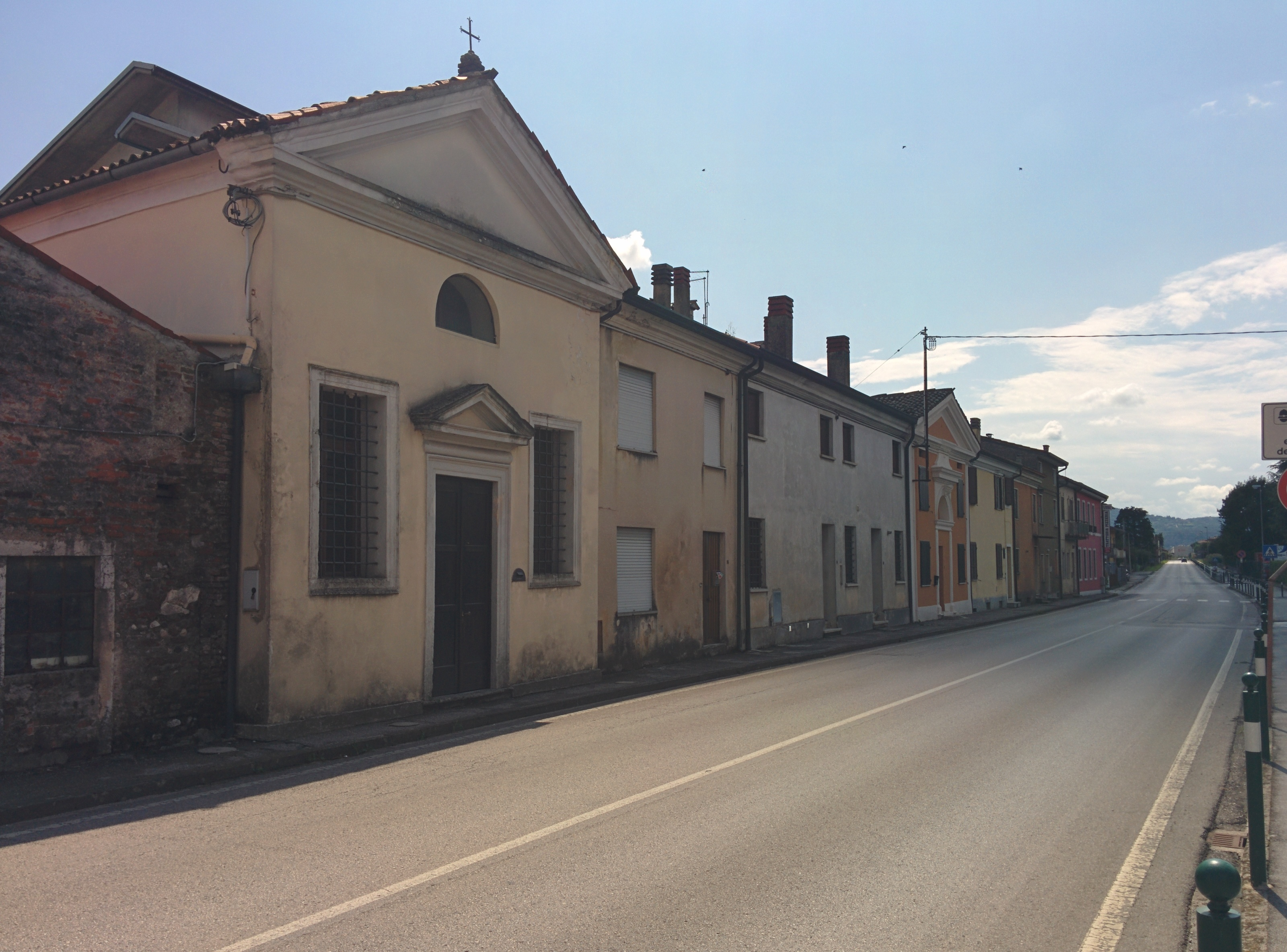
Villa Ghellini-Piovene

- Town hall. The seat of the town hall corresponds to an ancient villa of unknown origin that was purchased by the municipality in the late eighteenth or early nineteenth century, with the intention of making it the municipal seat. At the time it presented three floors as it is now, but much lower than the current one, since together they reached the height of the top of the current second floor. In a document of 1861 we find written that «the municipal house of Caldogno, which serves for office use, and school, and for the home of the chaplain, and municipal agent, found in fact in a state of disorder and worthy of prompt instauri». This led to a radical restoration in 1868 to a design by engineer Girolamo Bonato, which kept the subdivision in three floors, the windows of the ground floor remained with a simple frame, while those of the first floor were enriched with a "cimasa". The primitive internal layout was modified by various remodelings to adapt it to the various functions for which the building was used: until 1931 it was a municipal seat, from 1931 to 1959 it was an elementary school, it then became a School of Professional Initiation, then converted to Middle School when compulsory schooling was extended to 15 years. Some rooms were even a dental cabinet and post office. Between 1984 and 1987, after the decision to allocate the structure to the municipality, a complete renovation of the building took place, which kept intact only the western wall. The offices moved on 15 October 1987.
- Convent. The Convent is an ancient building of the early sixteenth century about half a mile from the parish church of Rettorgole near the canal Muzzana. It is so called by the elderly of the place because a local tradition wants it to have been a convent although, given the size, it was most likely a legacy to some religious order or some convent of Vicenza from which it took its name or, perhaps, it was used as a place of convalescence or quiet of some religious. In the eastern wall the windows were walled, and the stone frames of the latter were then covered by plaster. The window frames of the upper storey now serve as doorposts for the doors of the southern side giving into a small courtyard. The interiors were renovated and divided several times and the elegant fireplaces inside were lost. [95] Still intact is the gate on the eastern side that leads to a barn housing the stable, a barn and a woodshed. To the right of this entrance are traces of a fresco depicting a crucifix with faded forms of the Father, the Son and a globe that unleashes flames with probable subject, therefore, the Trinity. At the foot of the crucifix the fresco loses, leaving the design unknown. From the first decades of the 16th century to the present day it was modified many times by the various tenants until a radical intervention in 1970.

== Culture ==
=== Education ===
==== Schools ====
In Caldogno there are 4 state schools: a kindergarten (Giovanni Pascoli), two primary schools (San Giovanni Bosco in Caldogno and Carlo Collodi in Rettorgole) and a Secondary school of first degree (Dante Alighieri).

==== Libraries ====
In the capital there is the Civic Library, which is part of the network of libraries in Vicenza "Bibioinrete", along with most of the libraries belonging to the Library Network of Vicenza.

==== University ====
In Caldogno there is one of the 22 venues of the University of adults/elders of the territory of Vicenza.

== Sport ==
The main football team is the Calidonense that plays in “Promozione" and is affiliated to the L.R. Vicenza football team, while the other team of the municipality of Caldogno is “Cresole 80” with which there is a great sporting rivalry.

It is known as the birthplace of the ex-football player Roberto Baggio.

== Bibliography ==
- Galdino Pendin, Storia di Caldogno, Vicenza, La Serenissima, II edizione, 1997
- Antonio Canova, Giovanni Mantese, I castelli medioevali del Vicentino, Accademia Olimpica di Vicenza, Vicenza, 1979
