= Villa Caldogno =

UNESCO World Heritage Site
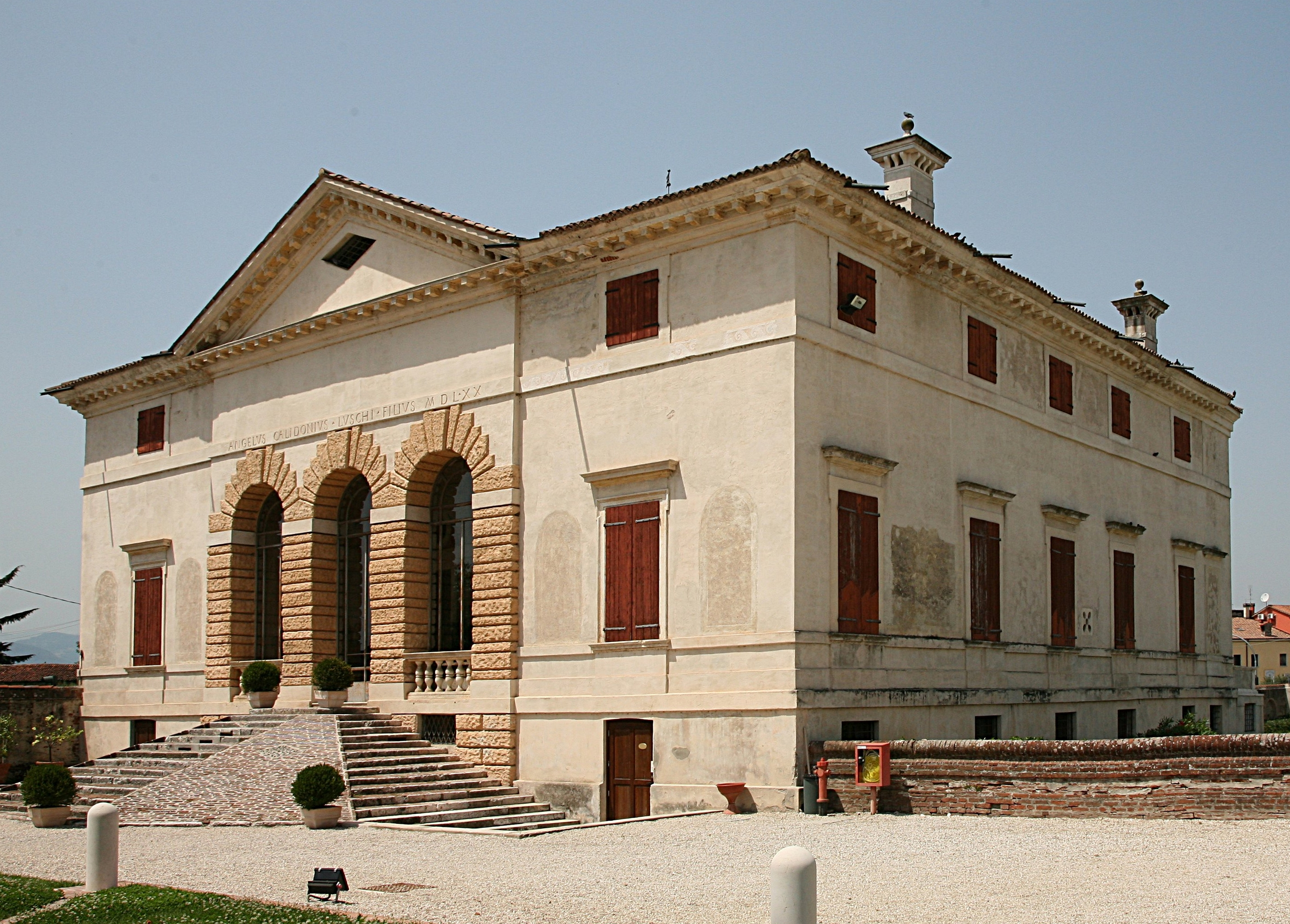
- Villa Caldogno Nordera

- Location within Veneto Location within Italy
- Location: Caldogno, Province of Vicenza, Veneto, Italy
- Part of: City of Vicenza and the Palladian Villas of the Veneto
- Criteria: Cultural: (i), (ii)
- Reference: 712bis-006
- Inscription: 1994 (18th Session)
- Extensions: 1996
- Area: 2.77 ha (6.8 acres)
- Website: www.villacaldogno.it
- Coordinates: 45°36′26″N 11°30′24″E

Villa Caldogno (also known as Caldogno Nordera) is a villa in the Veneto region of Italy, which is attributed to Italian Renaissance architect Andrea Palladio. It was built for the aristocratic Caldogno family on their estate in the village of Caldogno near Vicenza. It is also known as the "Villa Nordera" after Dr. Ettore Nordera who owned the property through a large part of the 20th century.

== History ==
A Latin inscription on the facade (Angelus Calidonius Luschi Filius MDLXX) dates the completion of the building to 1570 when it belonged to Angelo Caldogno. However, Angelo's father, Losco Caldogno, appears to have started to build in the 1540s, probably incorporating walls from a pre-existing building. 1570 is possibly the date of the completion of the villa's decorative scheme.

The villa is not included in I quattro libri dell'architettura, Palladio's treatise of 1570, in which the architect discussed a number of his creations. However, it is similar to certain villas, such as the Villa Saraceno, that Palladio is known to have created in the 1540s and 1550s.

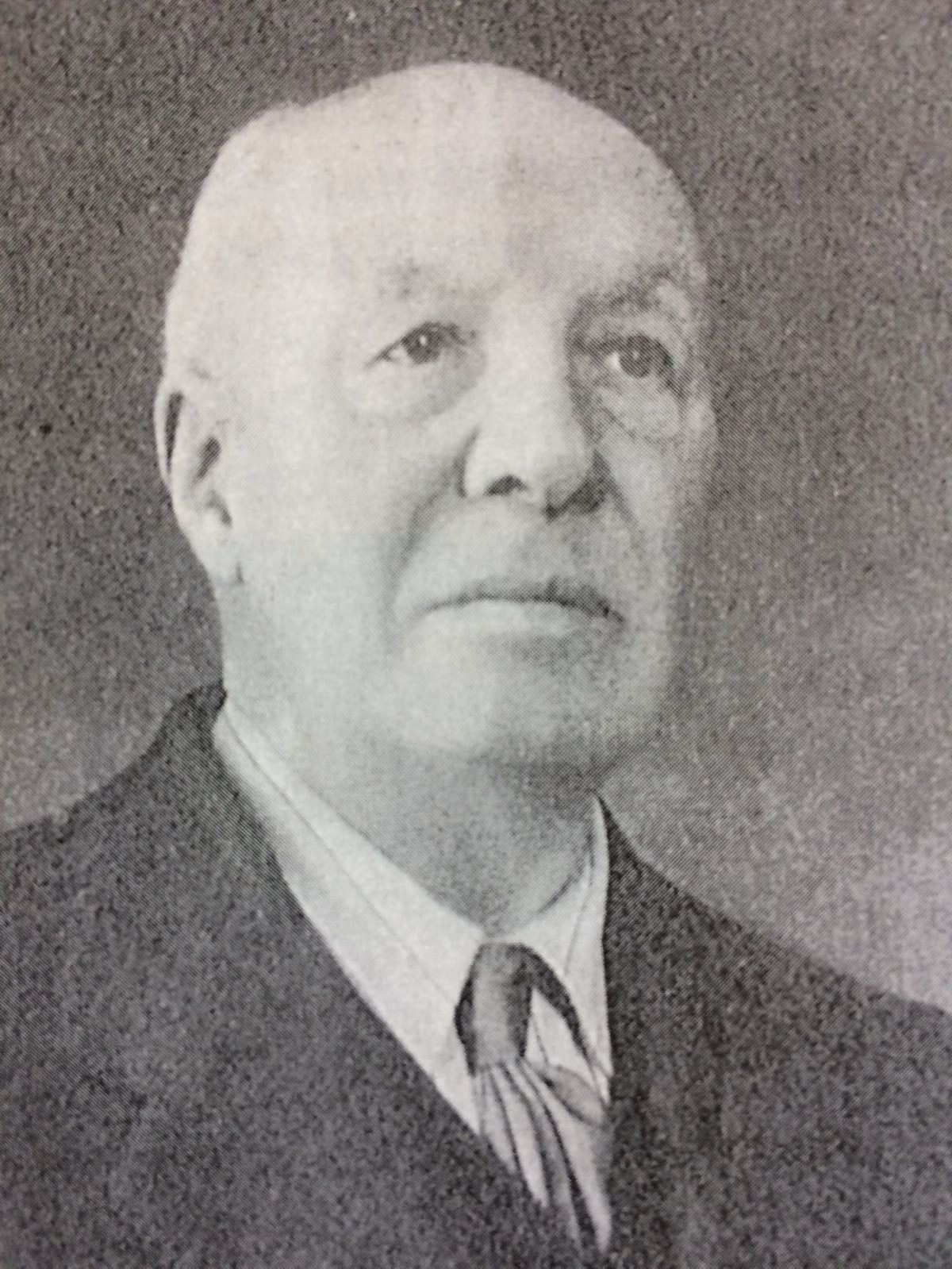
Dr. Ettore Nordera Director of the Istituto Medico Pedagogico Nordera

In 1932 the villa and the surrounding lands were purchased by Dr. Ettore Nordera, the director of the neurological medicine department of the hospital San Felice in Vicenza. During this time the buildings became part of an institute known as the “Istituto Medico Pedagogico Nordera”. The institute guested 150 children who lived under the guidance of the “Dorotee” nuns. Here they received psychological and medical assistance. It was during this period in which some constructions were added behind the main villa between 1937-39 to accommodate more space for the clinic.

Between 1941 and 1944 the villa was confiscated by the German military who used it as a military hospital. During this period the German military built a bomb shelter beside the main villa which is now the Villas ice room. After the war the Nordera Institute was reopened. The Nordera Institute at the Villa Caldogno-Nordera would eventually close and in 1978 part of the property was given to the communal administration. In 1986, the rest of the property including the Palladian villa was sold to the communal administration.

== Decorative scheme ==
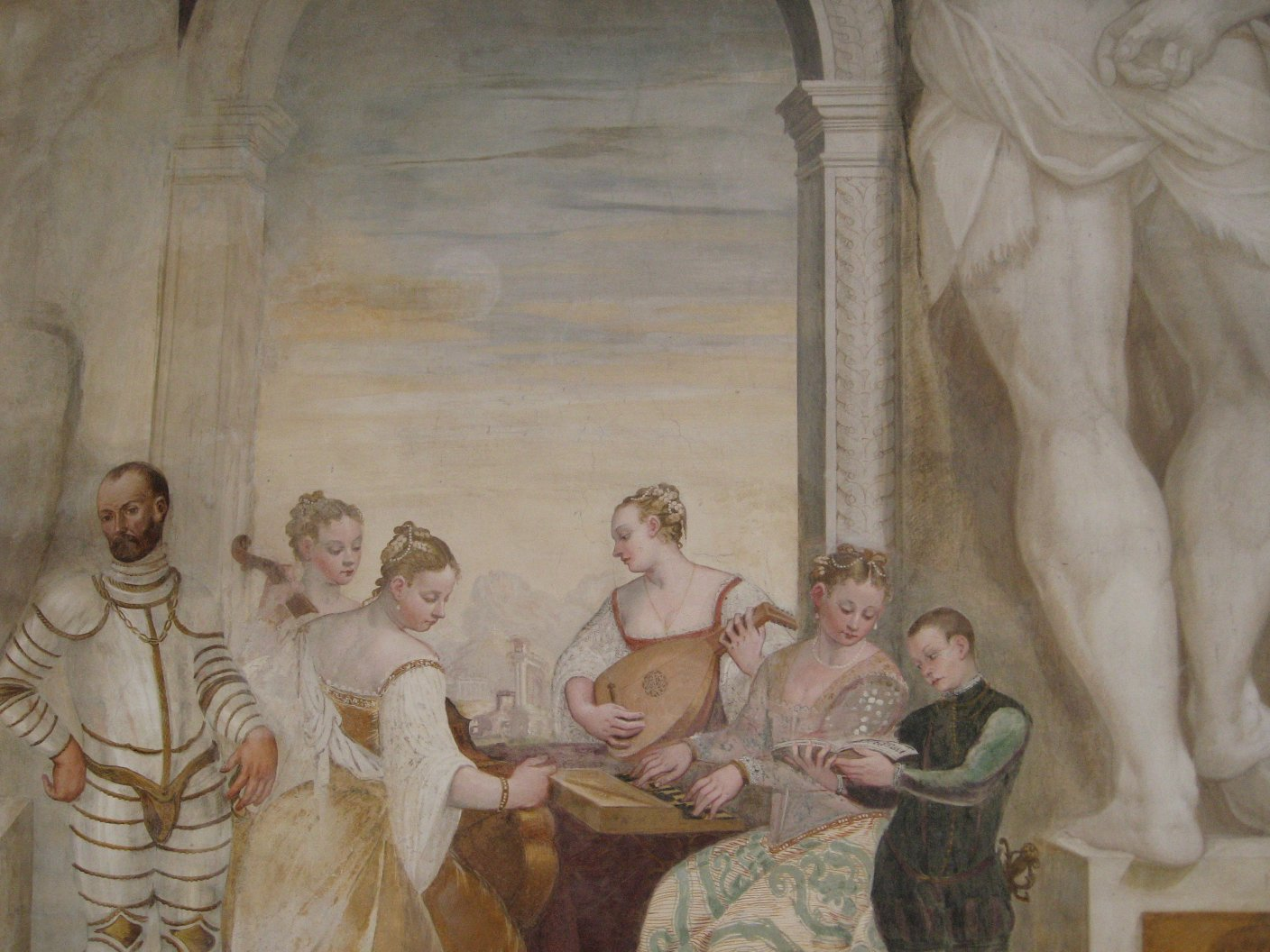
"The little Concert": fresco in the salon by Giovanni Antonio Fasolo.

The villa has frescoes by Giovanni Antonio Fasolo, who decorated Palladio's Teatro Olimpico, and Giovanni Battista Zelotti, who decorated a number of villas designed by Palladio. The frescoes at Villa Caldogno Nordera have been compared to Zelotti's work at Villa Foscari.

== Conservation status ==
In 1996, UNESCO included the Villa Caldogno in the World Heritage Site "City of Vicenza and the Palladian Villas of the Veneto". The villa is in municipal ownership and is open to the public.

== See also ==
- Palladian villas of the Veneto
- Palladian architecture
