= Palazzo Porto Colleoni Thiene =

Building in Thiene, Province of Vicenza, Italy

Coordinates: 45.7066°N 11.4783°E

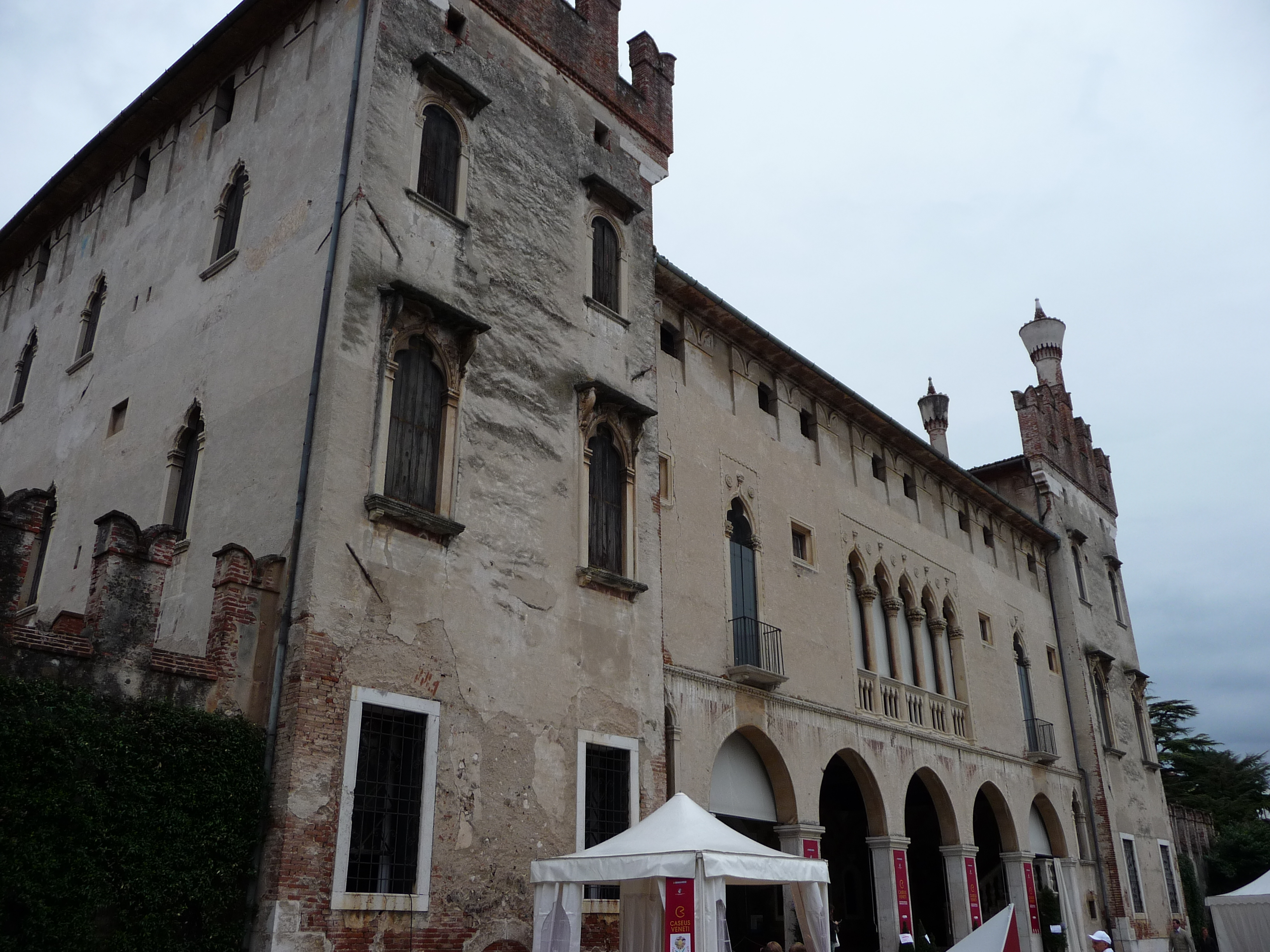
Castello di Thiene

The Palazzo Porto Colleoni Thiene, also called a villa or castello, is a prominent palace structure in the town center of Thiene.

== Description ==
The castle has two lateral battlement or tower-like corners, with merlonated roof edges. It was completed by 1476 in the late Gothic style typical of palaces in the Veneto, including the tall columns and ogival windows on the piano nobile. The initial architect was Domenico da Venezia, but the work was completed by Giovanni da Porta. The interior is frescoed by Giovanni Antonio Fasolo and Giovanni Battista Zelotti.

== Oratorio della Natività della Vergine ==
The Oratorio della Natività della Vergine (Oratory of the Nativity of the Virgin Mary), also known as the "Chiesetta Rossa" (Little Red Church), is a small late Gothic church or oratory, located on Corso Garibaldi. It was also erected in 1470 by the aristocratic Da Porto family. Its vertical frontage echoes the nearby palazzo, of which it was once the chapel.

== Gallery ==
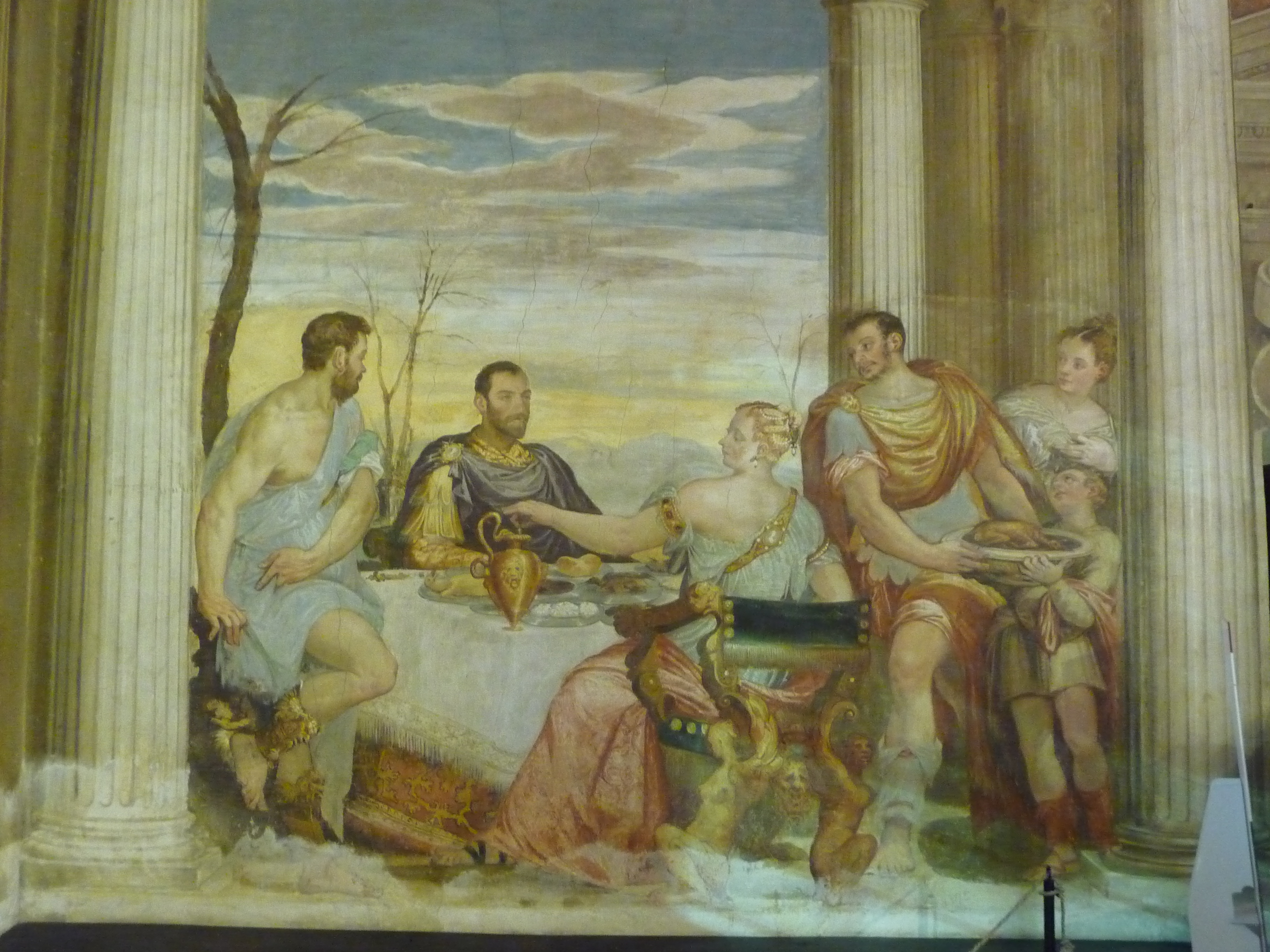
Frescoed interior

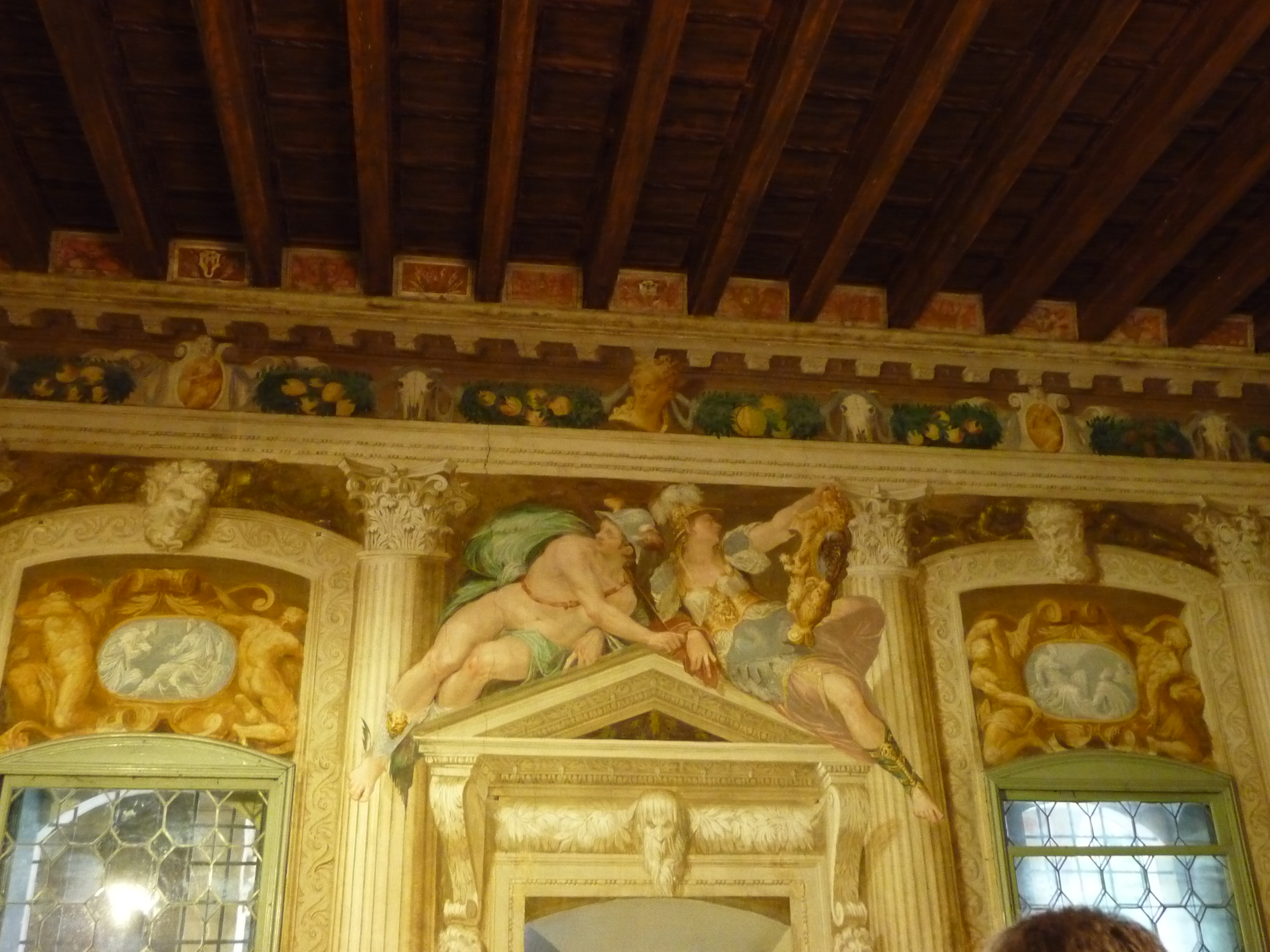
Frescoed interior

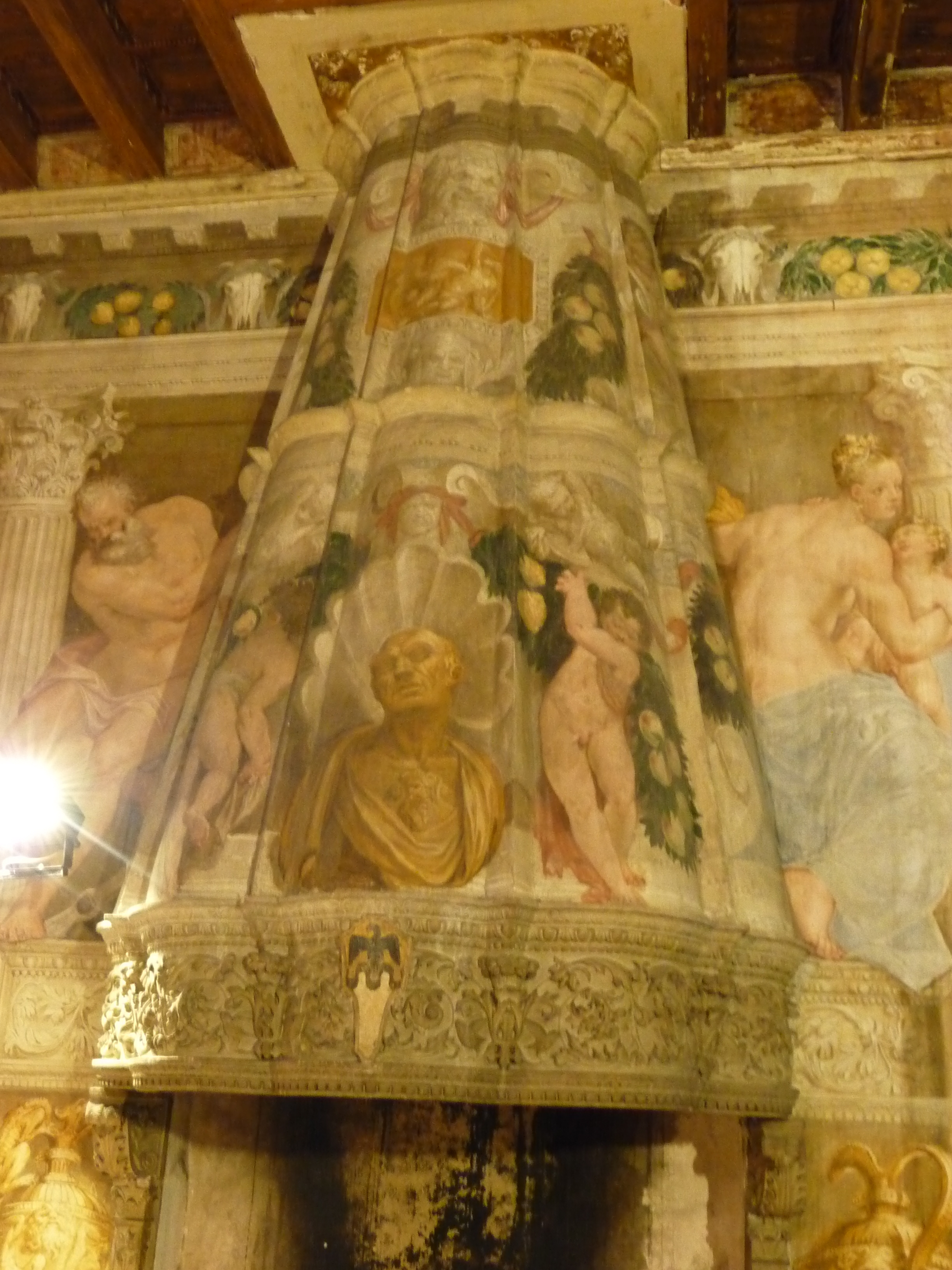
Frescoed interior

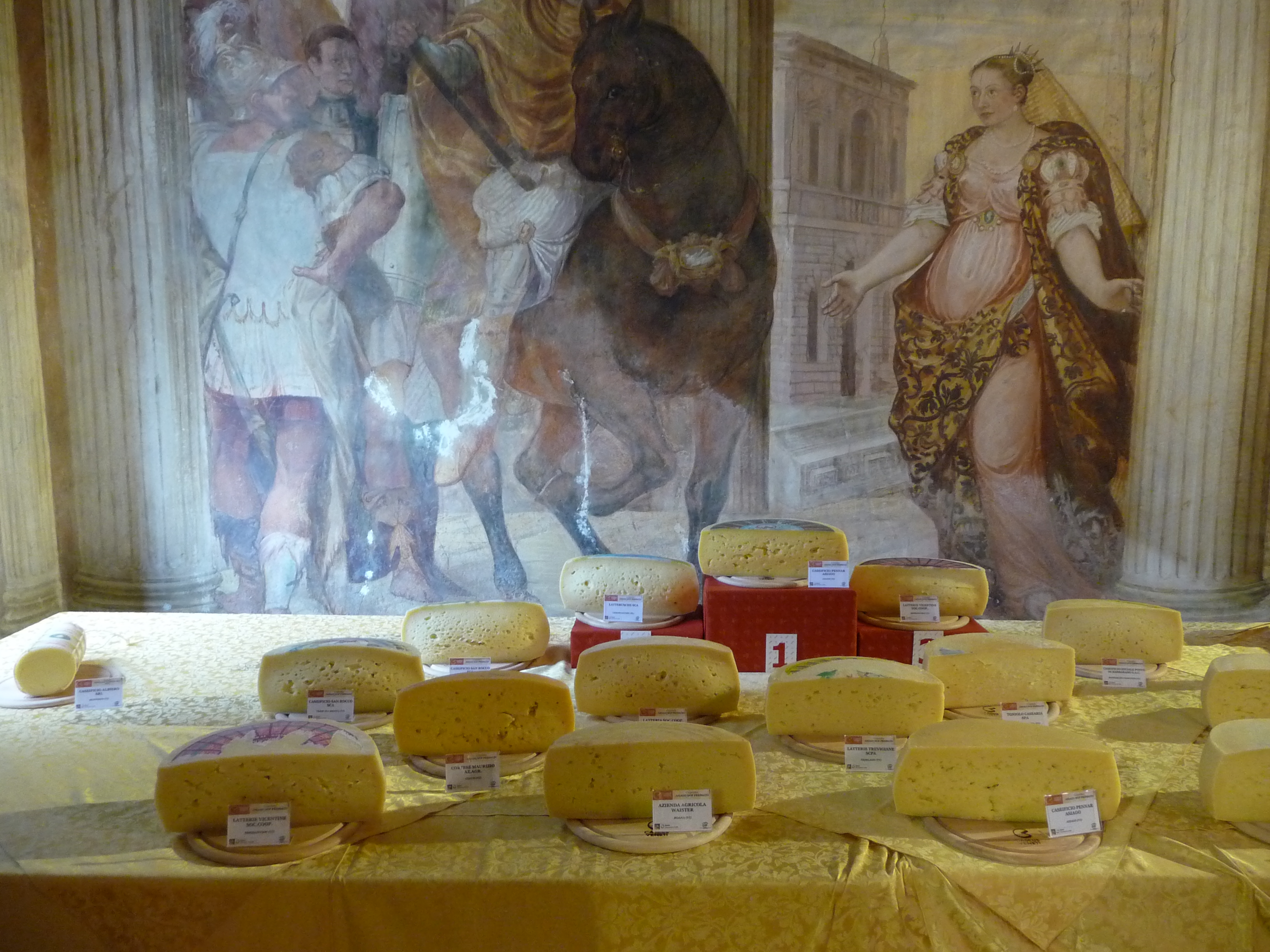
Frescoed interior

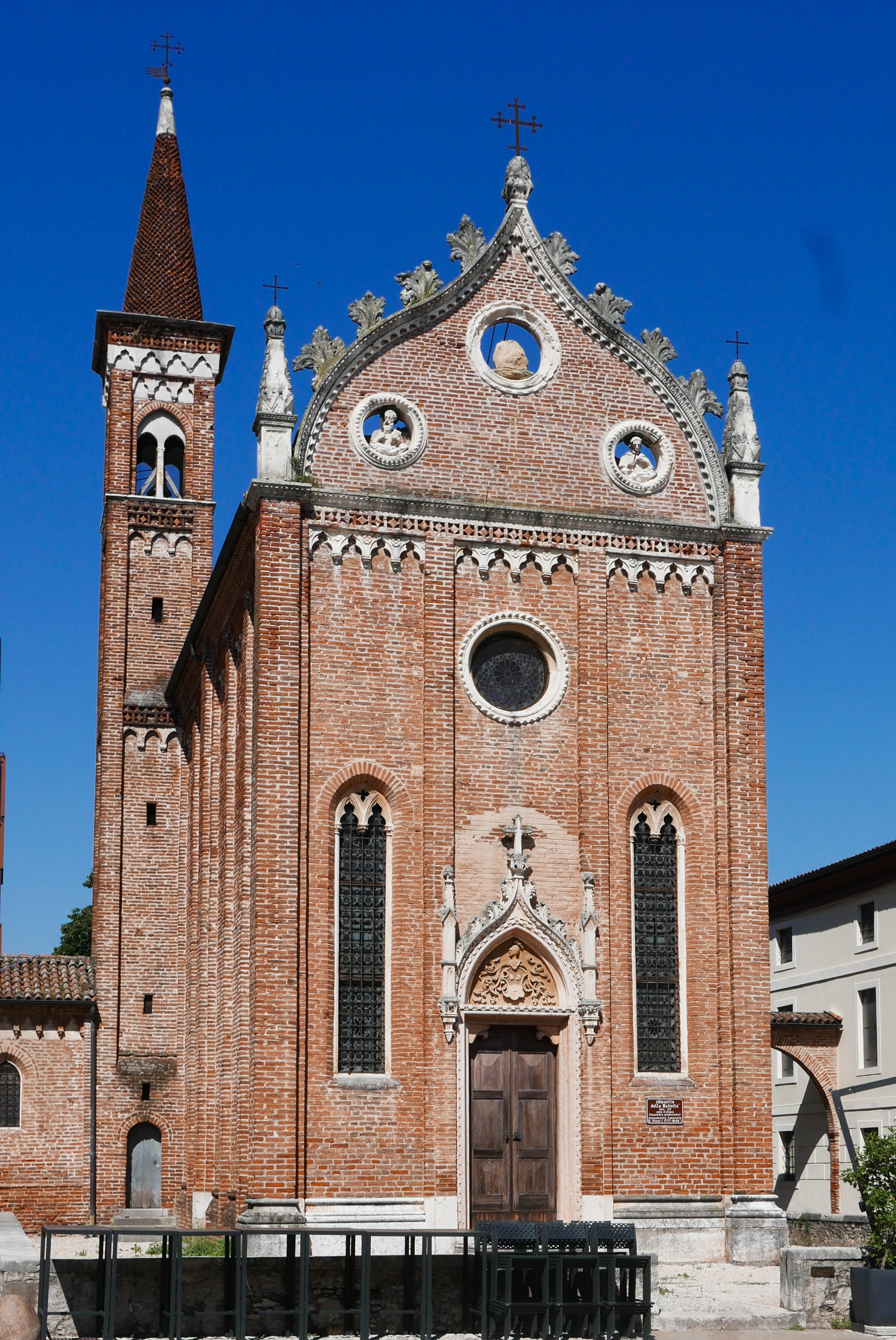
The former chapel

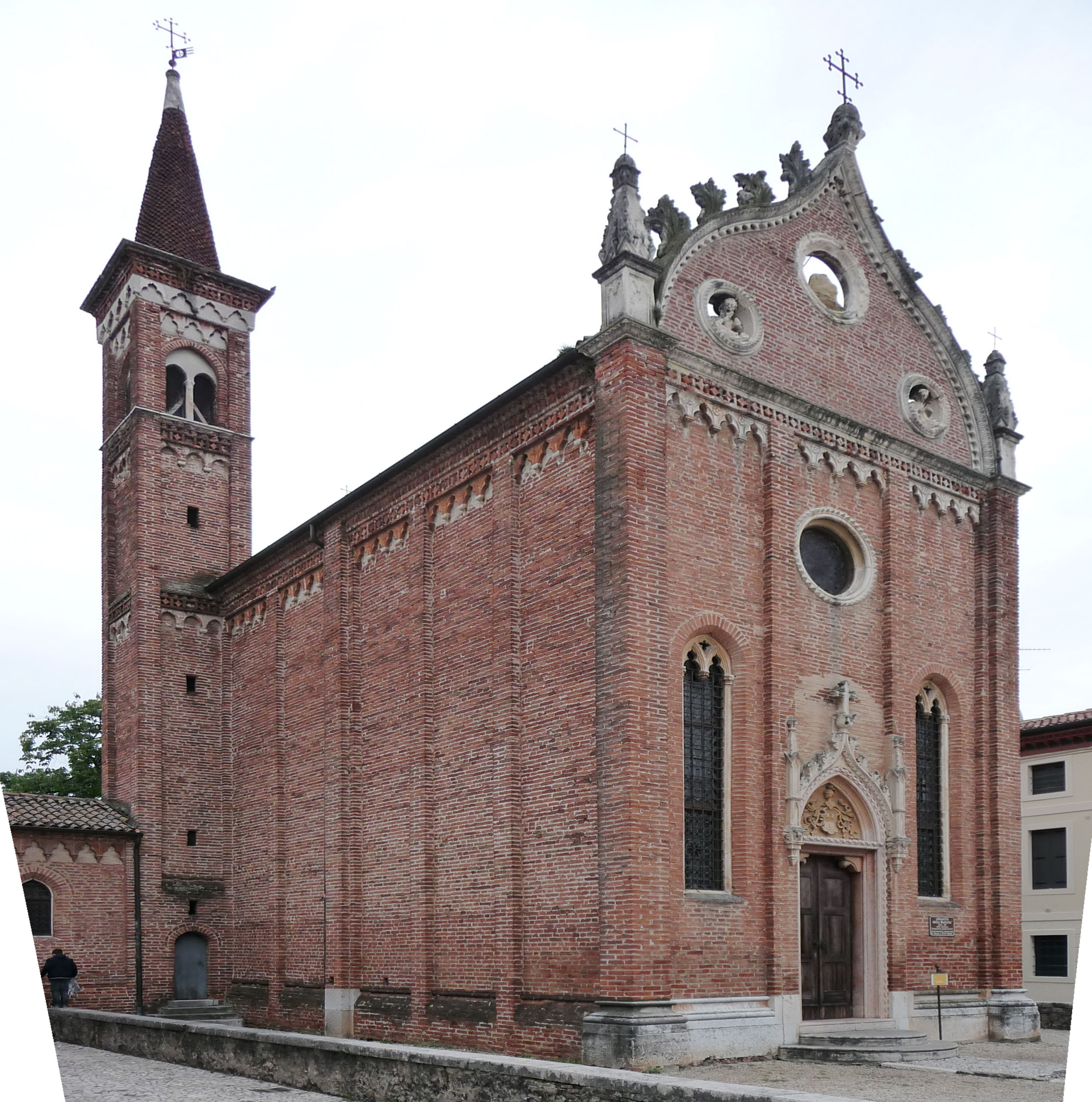
The former chapel
