= Franco Dal Maso =

Italian footballer

Personal information
- Date of birth: March 17, 1942 (age 84)
- Place of birth: Thiene, Italy
- Position: Midfielder

Senior career*
Years	Team	Apps	(Gls)
1960–1961	Internazionale	1	(0)
1961–1968	Carrarese	197	(?)
1968–1970	Pistoiese	40	(?)
- * Club domestic league appearances and goals

Franco Dal Maso (born March 17, 1942, in Thiene) is a retired Italian professional football player.
