= Casa Cogollo =

UNESCO World Heritage Site
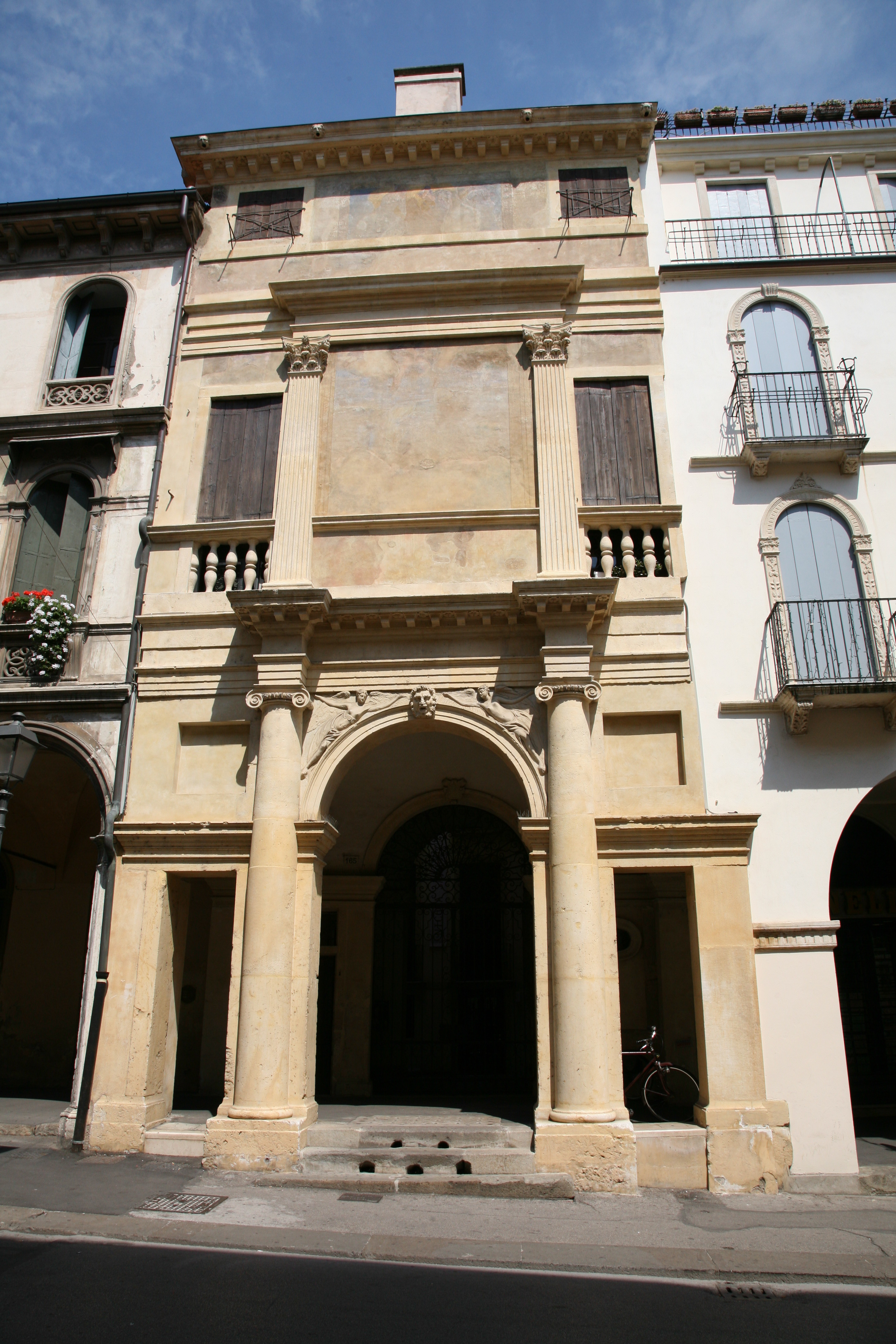

- Location within Veneto Location within Italy
- Location: Vicenza, Province of Vicenza, Veneto, Italy
- Part of: "City of Vicenza" part of City of Vicenza and the Palladian Villas of the Veneto
- Criteria: Cultural: (i)(ii)
- Reference: 712bis-001
- Inscription: 1994 (18th Session)
- Extensions: 1996
- Coordinates: 45°32′57″N 11°32′56″E

Casa Cogollo is a small palazzo in Vicenza built in 1559 and attributed to architect Andrea Palladio. Since 1994 it has formed part of the UNESCO World Heritage Site "City of Vicenza and the Palladian Villas of the Veneto".

Though known as the “House of Palladio”, in reality this building has no connection with the residence of the Vicentine master. Rather it is its dimensions—quite contained in comparison to the monumental emphasis of other Palladian palazzi—which has led astray those seeking a trace of the architect’s residence in the city.

In fact, the Maggior Consiglio (town council) forced the notary Pietro Cogollo to remodel the façade of his 15th century (Quattrocento) house as a contribution to the “decorum of the city”, making this provision (and a monetary investment in the work of not less than 250 ducats) a condition of their positive response to his request for Vicentine citizenship.

In the absence of documents and autograph designs, the attribution to Palladio of this most elegant façade still divides scholars. Yet, because of the intelligence of the architectural solution proposed, as well as the design of all the details, it is difficult to refer the project to any other designer. The constraints posed by a narrow space and the impossibility of opening windows at the centre of the piano nobile (because of an existing fireplace and its flue) induced Palladio to emphasise the façade’s central axis, by realising a structure with a ground floor arch flanked by engaged columns, and on the upper storey a tabernacle frame for a fresco by Giovanni Antonio Fasolo.

The ground level arch is flanked by two rectangular spaces which illuminate and provide access to the portico. Altogether they form a type of serliana, as already done at the Basilica Palladiana. The result is a composition of great monumental and expressive force, despite the simplicity of the means available.

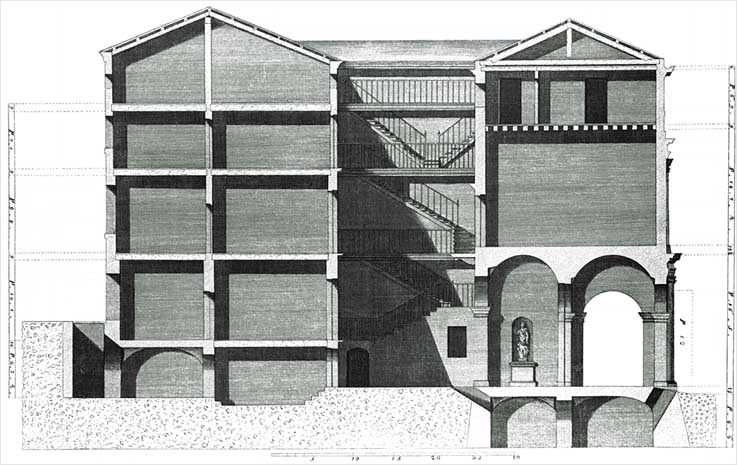
Cross section (Ottavio Bertotti Scamozzi, 1776)

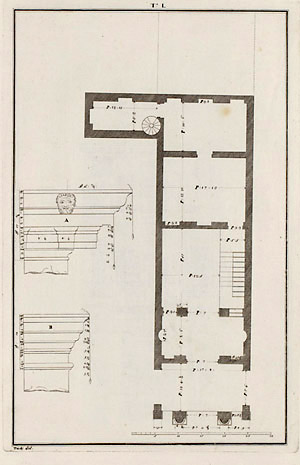
Floor plan (Ottavio Bertotti Scamozzi, 1776)

== Sources ==
- Casa Cogollo in the CISA website, now Palladio Museum (source for the first revision of this article, with kind permission)
