= Giovanni Antonio Fasolo =

Italian painter (1530–1572)

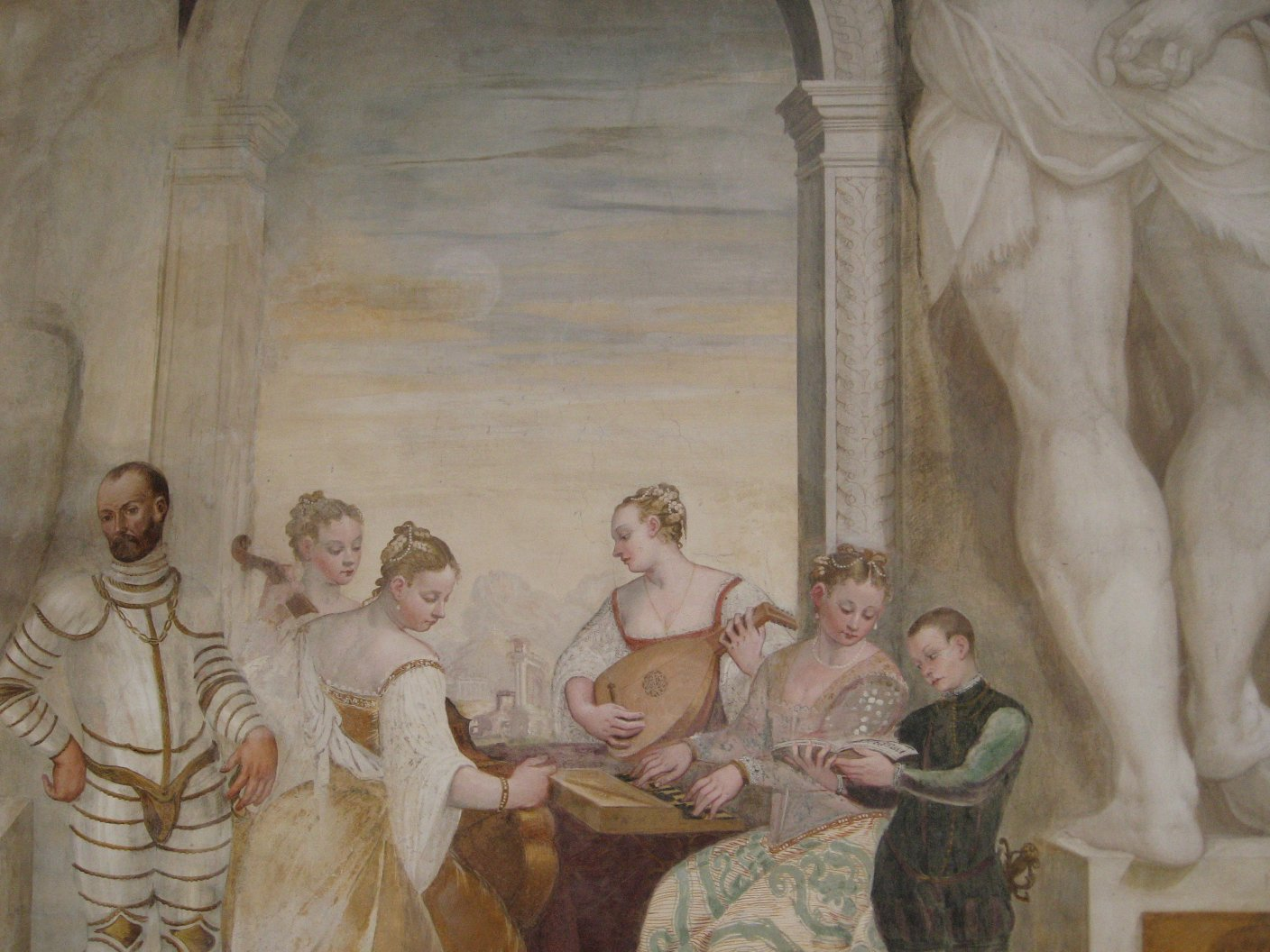
Fresco in Villa Caldogno Nordera.

Giovanni Antonio Fasolo (1530–1572) was a late Italian Renaissance painter of the Venetian school, active in Vicenza and surroundings.

A native of Mandello del Lario, he appears to have trained in the Venice studio of Paolo Veronese. By 1557, he was an independent fresco decorator. He worked at the frescoes of some buildings by Andrea Palladio, like Villa Caldogno (with Giovanni Battista Zelotti), Casa Cogollo, and Palazzo del Capitaniato (his last work). He also decorated with Zelotti the Palazzo Porto Colleoni Thiene at Thiene. In 1572 he died by an incident when he was working at the ceiling of the loggia of the Palazzo del Capitaniato in Vicenza.

One of his pupils was Alessandro Maganza.

== Works ==
Partial listing:

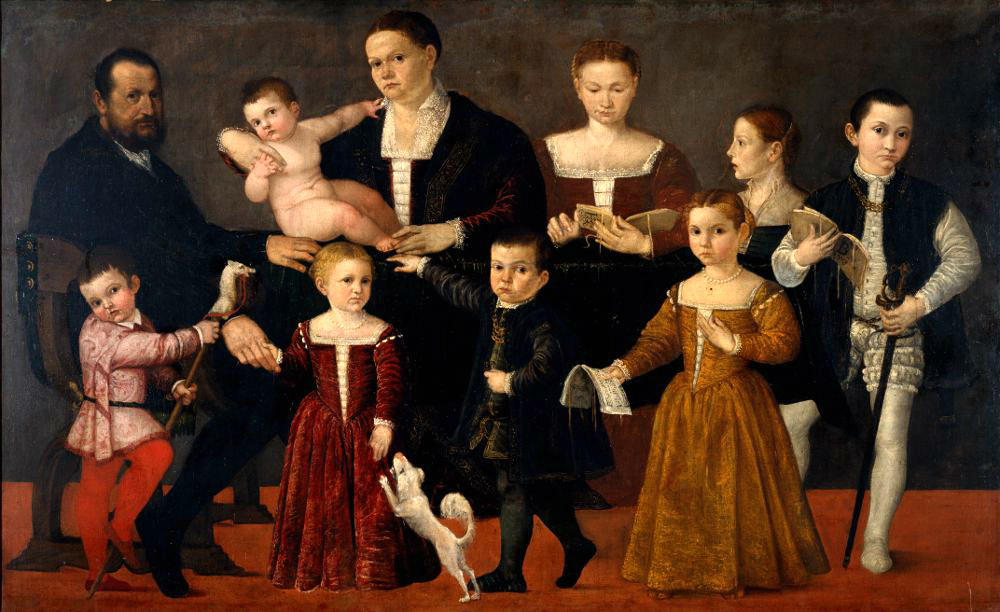
Portrait of the Valmarana Family

- Frescoes in Palazzo Chiericati, Vicenza
- Frescoes in Villa Sesso Schiavo, Sandrigo (Vicenza) (attributed)
- Portrait of the Valmarana Family
- Portrait of Ippolito Porto, Palazzo Valmarana, Vicenza
- Baptism of Saint John (Battesimo di San Giovanni), Natività della Beata Vergine Maria, Tricase (Lecce) (attributed)
- Frescoes in Casa Cogollo, Vicenza (traces)
- Portrait of Giuseppe Gualdo with His Sons Paolo and Paolo Emilio (Ritratto di Giuseppe Gualdo con i figli Paolo e Paolo Emilio) and Portrait of Paola Bonanome Gualdo with Her Daughters Laura and Virginia (Ritratto di Paola Bonanome Gualdo con le figlie Laura e Virginia), 1566-1567, Pinacoteca civica di Palazzo Chiericati, Vicenza
- Frescoes in Palazzo Porto Colleoni, Thiene (Vicenza), 1570 (with Giovanni Battista Zelotti), sections included: Cleopatra's Banquet, The Continence of Scipio and Sophonisba Before Masinissa - Mucius Scaevola,
- Frescoes in Villa Caldogno, Caldogno (Vicenza), 1570 (with Giovanni Battista Zelotti), sections included: Invitation to Dance, Playing Cards
- Frescoes and nine others in Palazzo del Capitaniato (1572), Vicenza

== See also ==
- Giovanni Battista Zelotti
- Palladian Villas of the Veneto

== Bibliography ==
- Freedberg, Sydney J. (1993). Pelican History of Art (ed.). Painting in Italy, 1500-1600. Penguin Books. p. 565.
