= Thiene =

- Comune
- Comune di Thiene
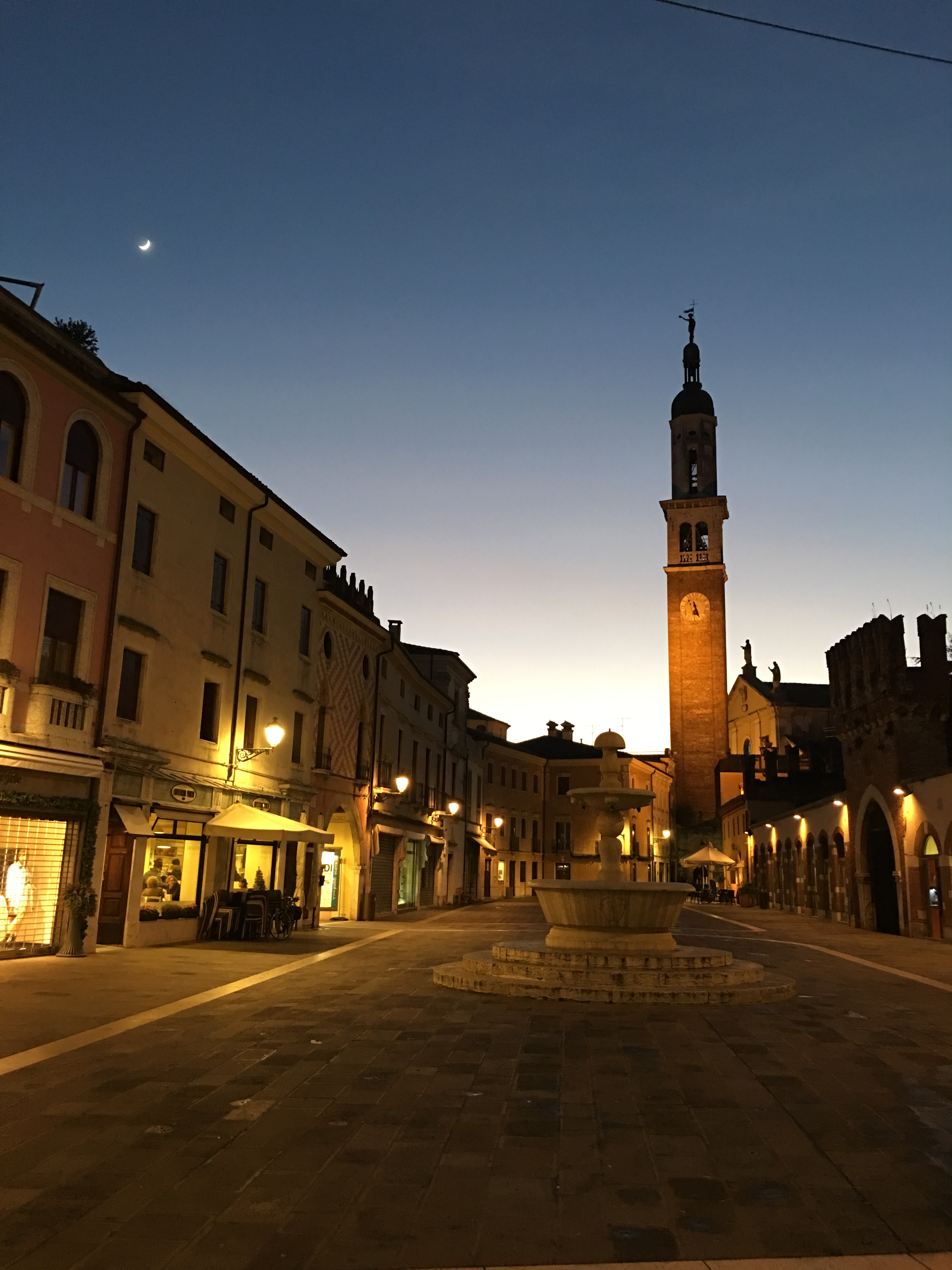
- Place Chilesotti, Thiene

- Location within Italy Location within Veneto
- Coordinates: 45°42′30″N 11°28′40″E
- Country: Italy
- Region: Veneto
- Province: Vicenza (VI)
- Frazioni: Borgo Lampertico, Rozzampia, Santo

Government
  - Mayor: Gianantonio Michelusi

Area
  - Total: 19.7 km^{2} (7.6 sq mi)
- Elevation: 147 m (482 ft)

Population (January 1, 2014)
  - Total: 23,927
  - Density: 1,210/km^{2} (3,150/sq mi)
- Demonym: Thienesi
- Time zone: UTC+1 (CET)
  - Summer (DST): UTC+2 (CEST)
- Postal code: 36016
- Dialing code: 0445
- Patron saint: Saint Cajetan of Thiene
- Saint day: August 7
- Website: Official website

Thiene (Italian: [ˈtjɛːne]) is a city and comune in the province of Vicenza, in northern Italy, located approximately 75 kilometres (47 mi) west of Venice and 200 kilometres (120 mi) east of Milan.

The city has an active and lively industrial sector, composed mainly of small to medium-sized companies.

The Centro Europeo per i Mestieri del Patrimonio is located at Villa Fabris.

This wealthy community has recently been the destination of numerous immigrants, primarily from Morocco, Asia and Central Europe.

== History ==
Of ancient Roman origin, it was acquired by the Visconti of Padua in the Middle Ages. Later it was a free commune, and subsequently part of the Republic of Venice.

== Economy ==
Once Volare Group had its head office in Thiene.

== Main sights ==
Landmarks include:

- Palazzo Porto Colleoni Thiene (called The Castle, and also villa), built in the 15th century according to late Venetian-Gothic style. The main façade is characterized by a central portico with mullioned windows flanked by towers with merlons. The interior has frescoes by Giovanni Antonio Fasolo with Giovanni Battista Zelotti.
- Villa Thiene Cornaggia -Gothic architecture palace from the 15th century.
- Villa Beregan Cunico (17th century).
- Duomo -Baroque style Cathedral of Thiene
- San Vincenzo - Romanesque Gothic church dating to 1333; frescoes depicting the life of St Vincent date to 15th century.
- Oratory of the Natività della Vergine - small gothic jewel of a church.

== Notable people ==
- Arturo Ferrarin (1895 - 1941), famous Italian aviator
- Franco Dal Maso (born 1942), retired Italian professional football player
- Davide Rigon (born 1986), Italian racing driver
- Thomas Ceccon (born 2001), Italian swimmer, current world record holder in the long course 100 metre backstroke with a time of 51.60 seconds
