= Giovanni Battista Zelotti =

Italian painter (1526–1578)

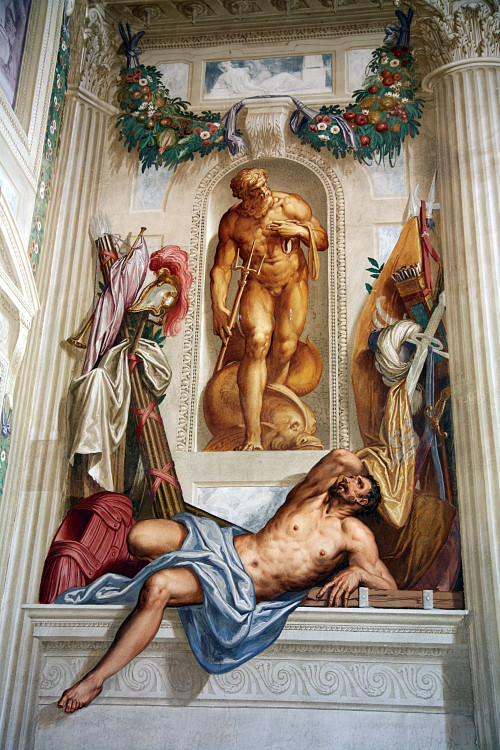
Fresco from Villa Emo, west wall of the hall.

Giovanni Battista Zelotti (Italian pronunciation: [dʒoˈvanni batˈtista ddzeˈlɔtti]; 1526 – 28 August 1578) was an Italian painter of the late Renaissance, active in Venice and her mainland territories.

He appears to have been born in Verona, then part of the Venetian mainland, and trained with Antonio Badile and Domenico Riccio, as well as perhaps Titian. Bernasconi claims he trained with his uncle Paolo Farinati. He is called Battista da Verona by Vasari, and was also known as Battista Farinati.

He was a contemporary of Paolo Veronese and shared work in the Villa Soranza near Castelfranco (1551) and at Venice: the ceiling of the Sala del Consiglio dei Dieci in the Doge's Palace (1553-4); the Biblioteca Marciana (1556-7), and the Palazzo Trevisan (1557) on Murano.

Zelotti came to embody the Veronese tradition on the mainland. He frescoed villas designed by Andrea Palladio, notably Villa Emo and Villa Foscari, where he worked with Bernardino India and Battista Franco: the exact number of Palladian villas he frescoed is not known. With the painter Giovanni Antonio Fasolo he worked also at Villa Caldogno (about 1570) and at Palazzo Porto Colleoni Thiene. In the 1570s he decorated the Castello del Catajo of the Obizzi family at Battaglia Terme with 40 frescoes. He also worked in Mantua for the house of Gonzaga.

== See also ==
- Giovanni Antonio Fasolo
- Palladian Villas of the Veneto
