= San Cassiano (disambiguation) =

San Cassiano is a town and comune in the Italian province of Lecce and region of Apulia in south-east Italy.

San Cassiano may also refer to:

- San Cassiano, Venice, Roman Catholic church in Venice, Italy
- San Cassiano Altarpiece, painting by Antonello da Messina
- San Cassiano Formation, geologic formation located on the Southern Alps
- Teatro San Cassiano, first public opera theatre in Venice, Italy

== See also ==
- Abbey of San Cassiano
- Cassiano (disambiguation)
- San Casciano (disambiguation)
