= Giuseppe Bernardino Bison =

Italian painter (1762–1844)

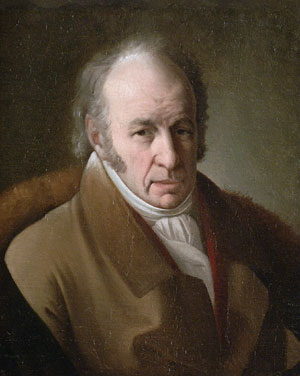
Giuseppe Bernardino Bison; portrait by Giuseppe Tominz (1830)

Giuseppe Bernardino Bison (16 June 1762 – 24 August 1844) was an itinerant Italian painter of frescoes, landscapes, vedute, capriccios and some religious works.

== Biography ==
He was born in Palmanova. When he was still a boy, his family moved to Brescia, where he saw the works of Girolamo Romani and decided to become a painter. Later, his family moved again, to Venice, where he enrolled at the Accademia di Belle Arti di Venezia and worked with Costantino Cedini. While there, he became friends with the architect Gian Antonio Selva, and went with him to Ferrara in 1787 to help decorate the Palazzo Bottoni.

Shortly after, he was in Padua, working as a set designer for the Obizzi family and, in 1790, was commissioned to do decorations for the Castello del Catajo. Two years later, he did similar work at the Palazzo Maffetti-Manzoni, then moved to Treviso, where he did frescoes on the ceiling of the Church of Saint Andrew in Volpago del Montello, the oratory of the Villa Bragadin in Ceggia and secular decorations for several villas in Lancenigo and Breda di Piave. From 1798 to 1800, he collaborated with Selva on decorations at the Palazzo Dolfin Manin in Venice.

Moving on to Trieste, he collaborated with Matteo Pertsch and the sculptor Antonio Bosa (1780–1845) to provide decorations for the Palazzo Carciotti and the stock exchange building. In 1811, he was in Zara, working at the Palazzo del Governatore. This was followed by decorative work (now lost) at the theaters in Vipacco and Gorizia.

At this time, he began to take advantage of a growing market for paintings in the homes of well-to-do non-aristocrats and, working in conjunction with a local art dealer named Tosoni, produced a wide variety of landscapes, vedute and other genres to satisfy local tastes. His canvases were expensive, but also very large.

In 1831, despite his successes in Trieste, he began wandering again, returning briefly to Brescia, then settling in Milan where he took some smaller commissions, but was not very successful and died poor.

== Collections ==
Bison's work is held in the permanent collections of several museums, including the Cooper Hewitt, the Princeton University Art Museum, the University of Michigan Museum of Art, the Clark Art Institute, the Detroit Institute of Arts, the Allen Memorial Art Museum, the Harvard Art Museums, the Metropolitan Museum of Art, the Norton Simon Museum, the Blanton Museum of Art, and the British Museum.

== Selected paintings ==
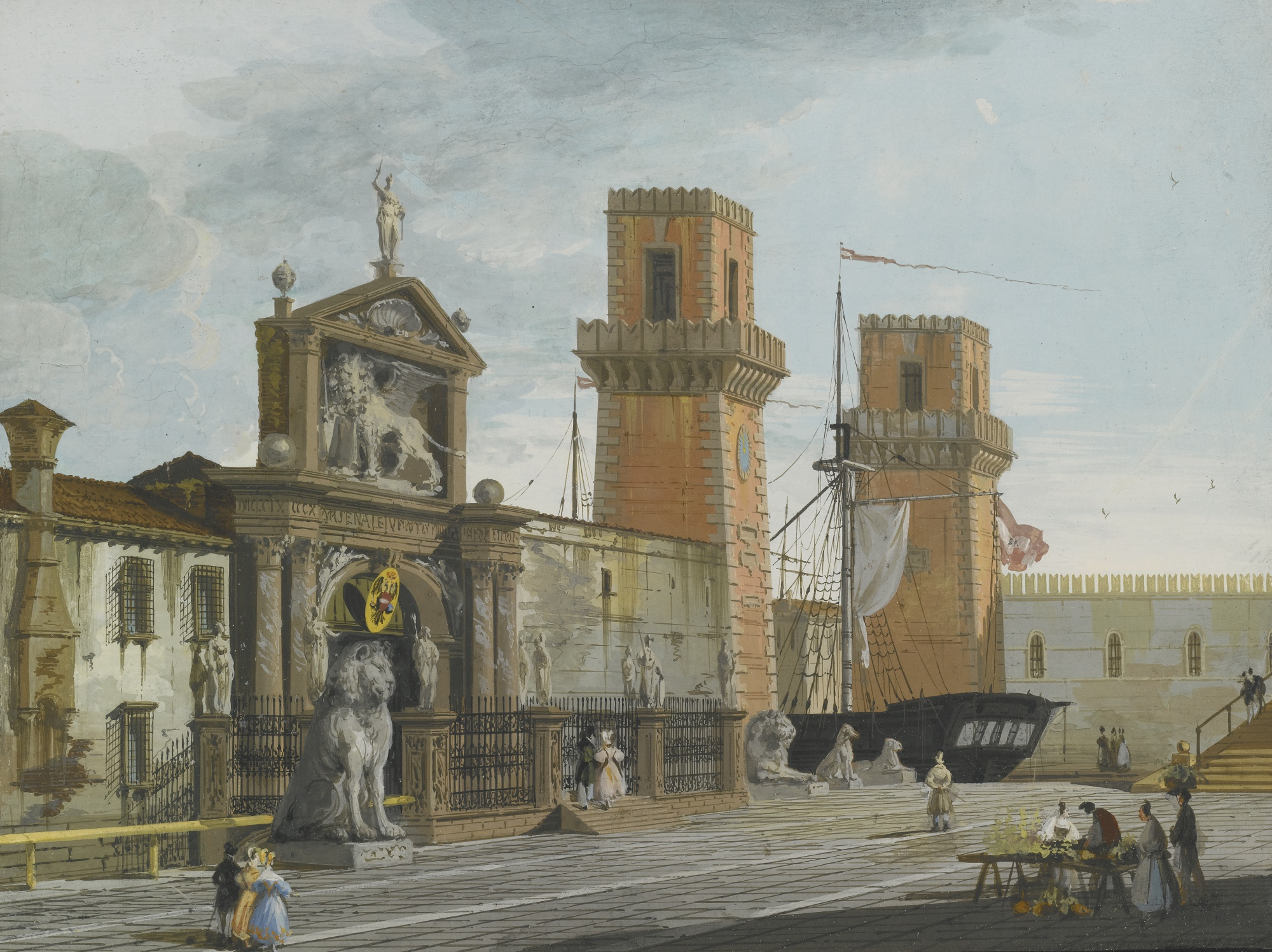
The Arsenale in Venice

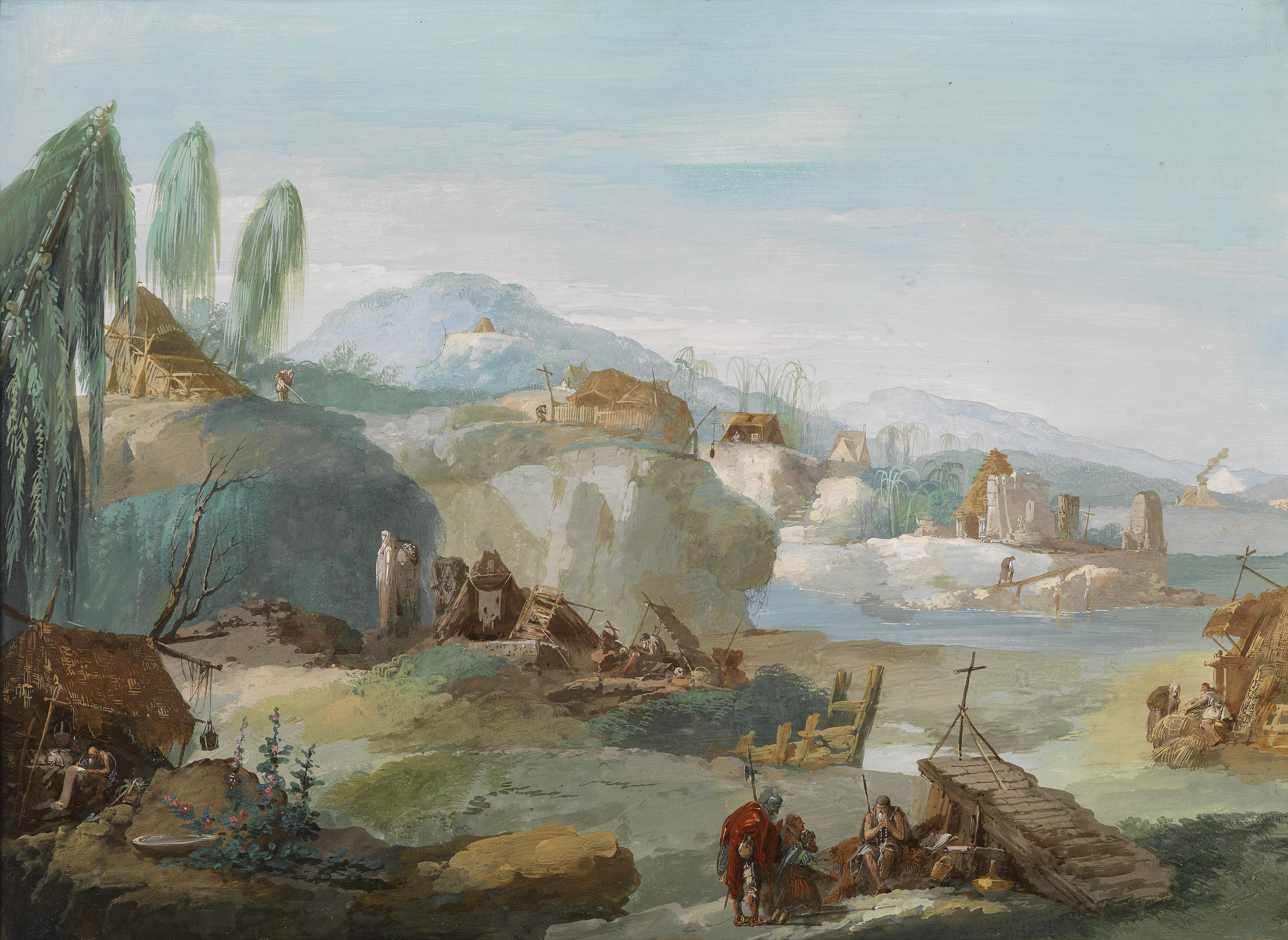
The Hermits of Thebes

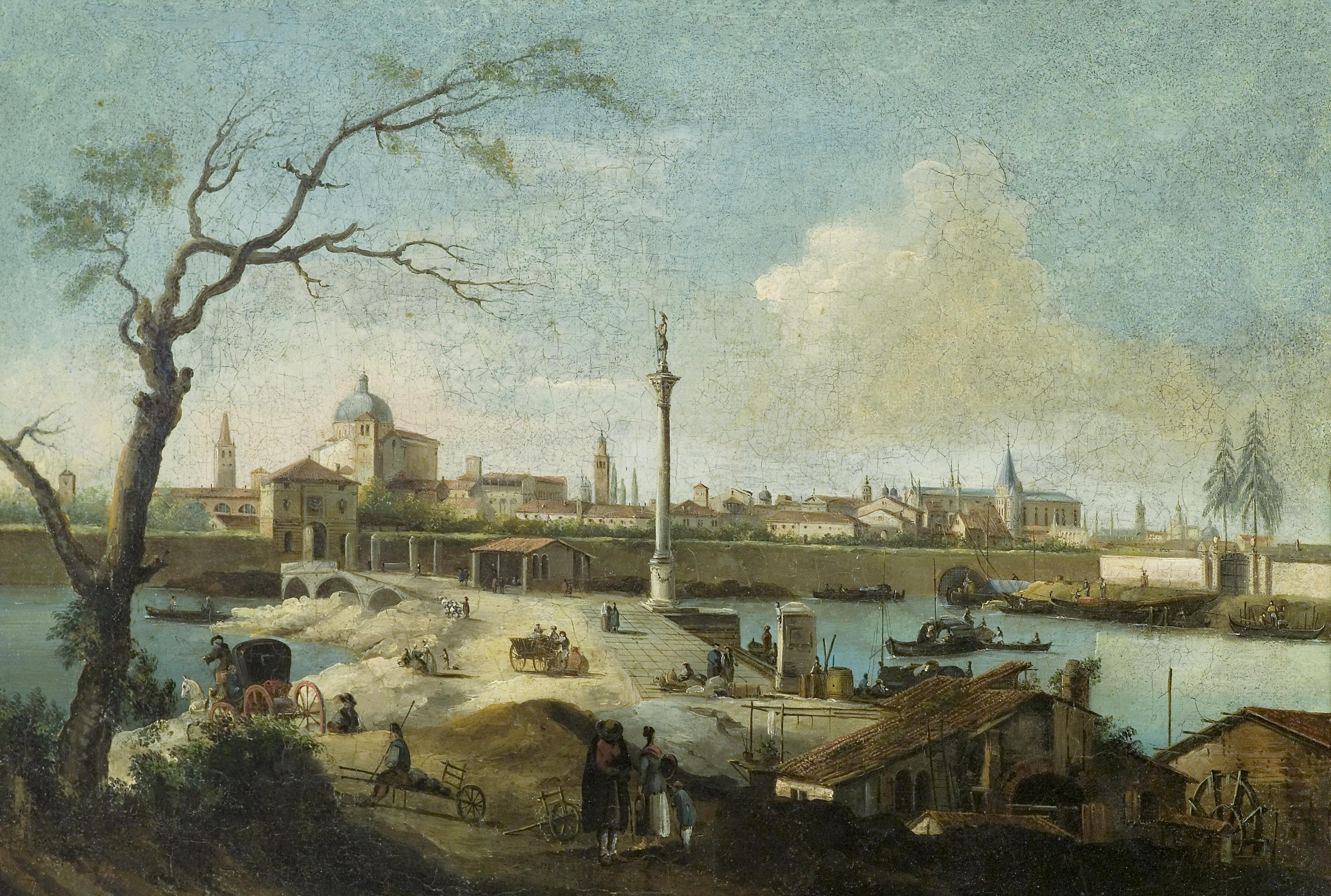
Capriccio of Padua

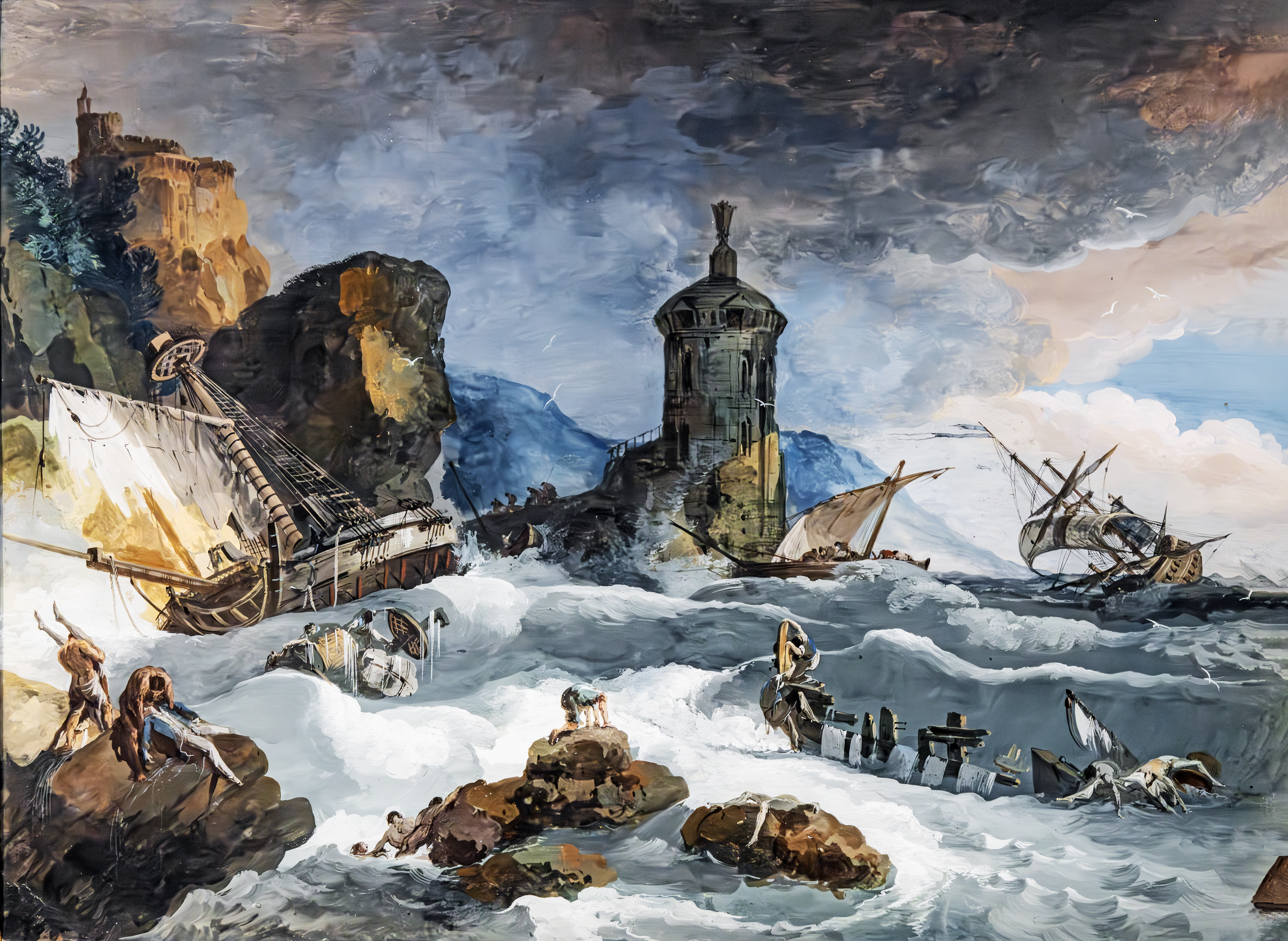
Storm with shipwreck - Pinacoteca Egidio Martini (Venice)

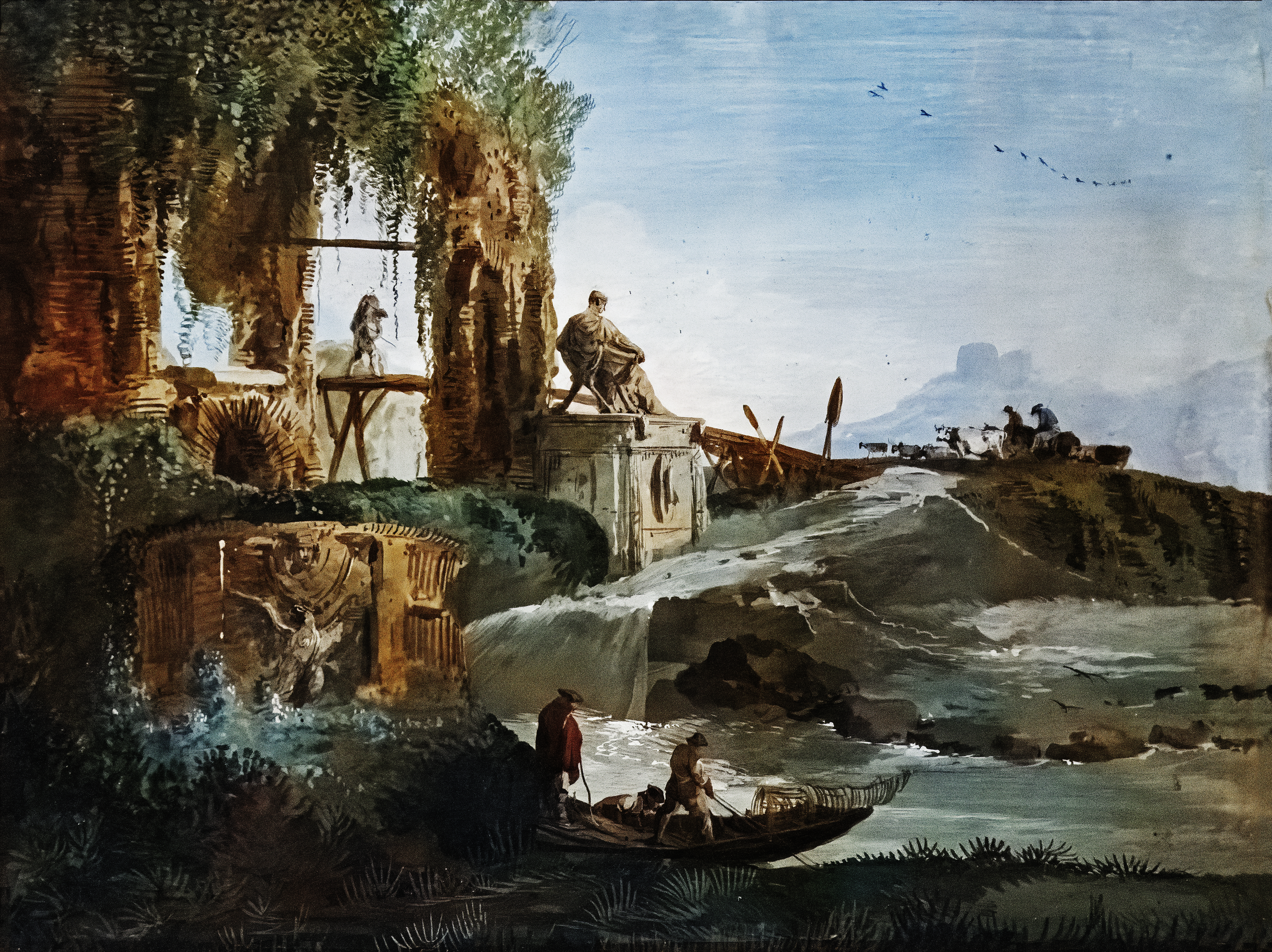
Landscape with waterfall and ancient monument Pinacoteca Egidio Martini (Venice)

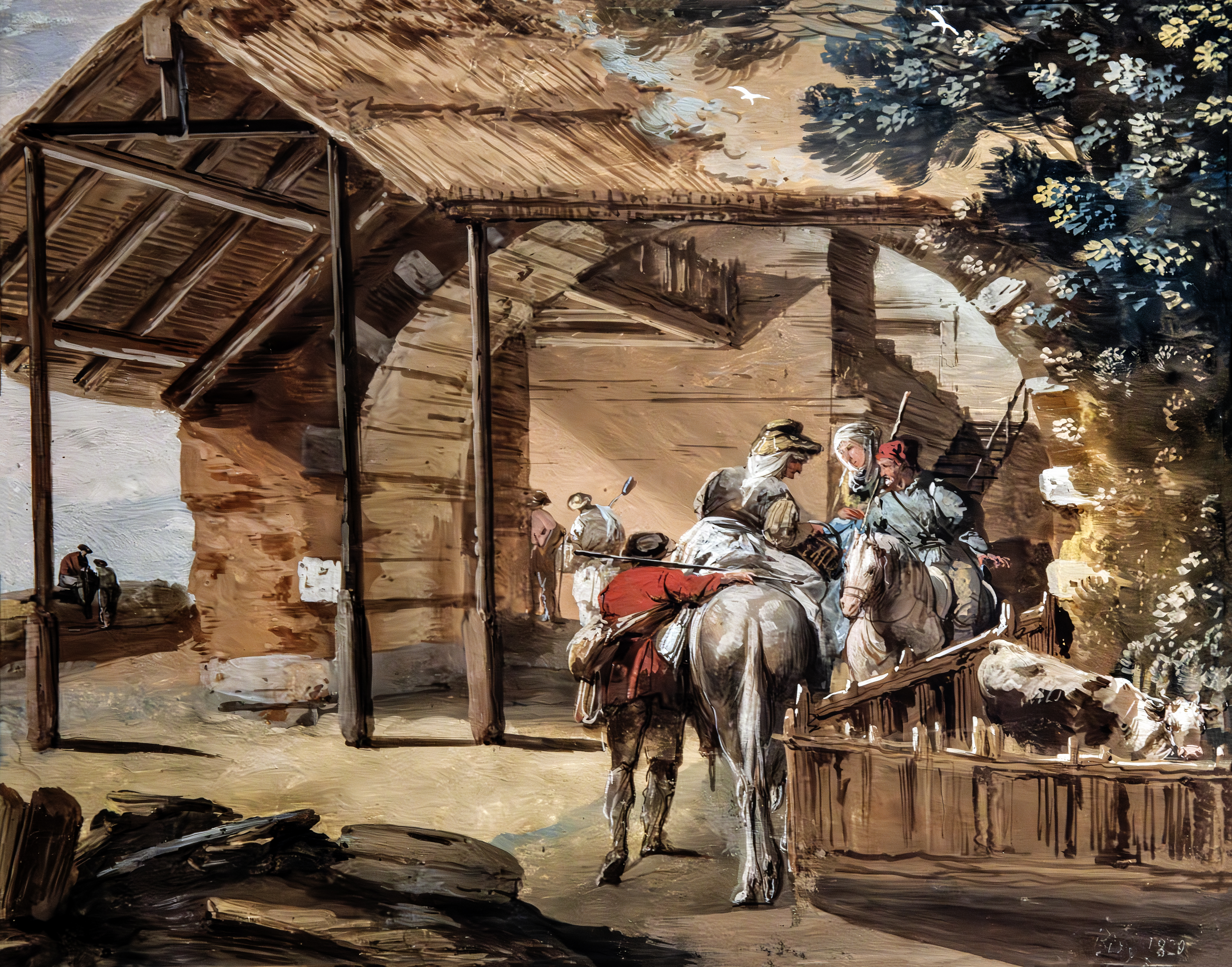
Scene with women on horseback on a farm Pinacoteca Egidio Martini (Venice)

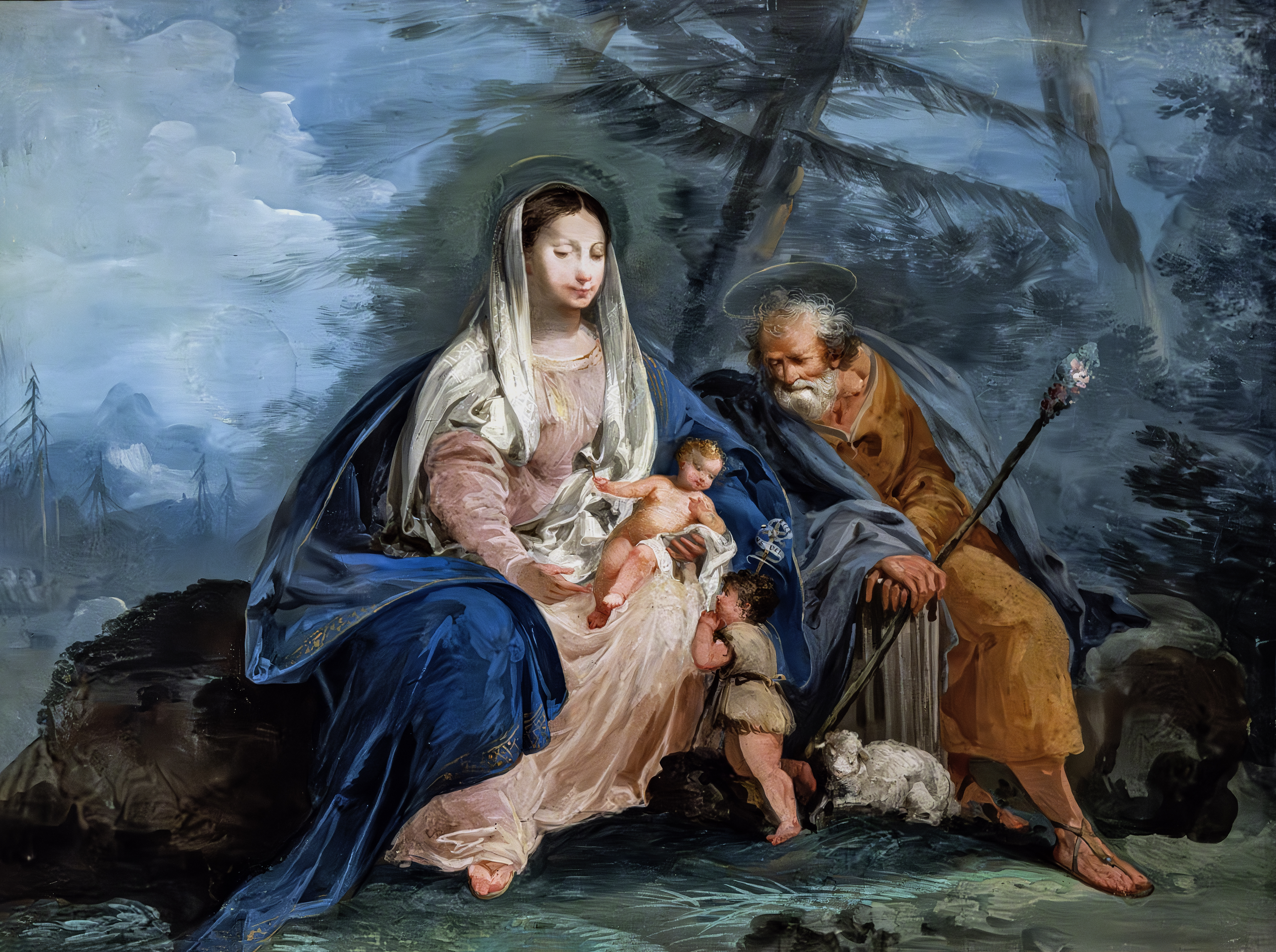
Holy Family Pinacothèque Egidio-Martini Venice
