= Cassiano =

Cassiano may refer to:

Given name:

- Cassiano Conzatti (1862–1951), Italian-born botanist, explorer and pteridologist, director of the Oaxaca Botanical Garden in Mexico
- Cassiano Leal (born 1971), former international freestyle swimmer from Brazil
- Cassiano Dias Moreira (born 1989), Brazilian forward
- Cassiano dal Pozzo (1588–1657), Italian scholar and patron of arts
- Cassiano Ricardo (1895–1974), Brazilian journalist, literary critic, and poet
- Cassiano Branco (1897-1970), Portuguese architect
- Cassiano Mendes da Rocha (born 1975), former Brazilian football player

Surname:

- Dick Cassiano, halfback in the National Football League
- Sérgio Cassiano (born 1967), Brazilian jazz composer, percussionist, writer, producer, and bandleader

Stage name:

- Cassiano (1943–2021), Brazilian singer-songwriter and guitarist

Places:

- 18335 San Cassiano, minor planet discovered September 19, 1987
- San Cassiano, town and commune in the Italian province of Lecce and region of Apulia in south-east Italy
- San Cassiano, Venice, 14th-century Roman Catholic church in the San Polo sestiere of the Italian city of Venice
- San Cassiano Formation, geologic formation on the Southern Alps (Northeast of Italy) in the Dolomites

== See also ==
- Assiano
- CASINO
- Casino
- Cassano (disambiguation)
- Cassian (disambiguation)
- Cassino
- San Cassiano (disambiguation)
- San Casciano (disambiguation)
