= Sammlung alter Musikinstrumente =

Collection of Musical Instruments

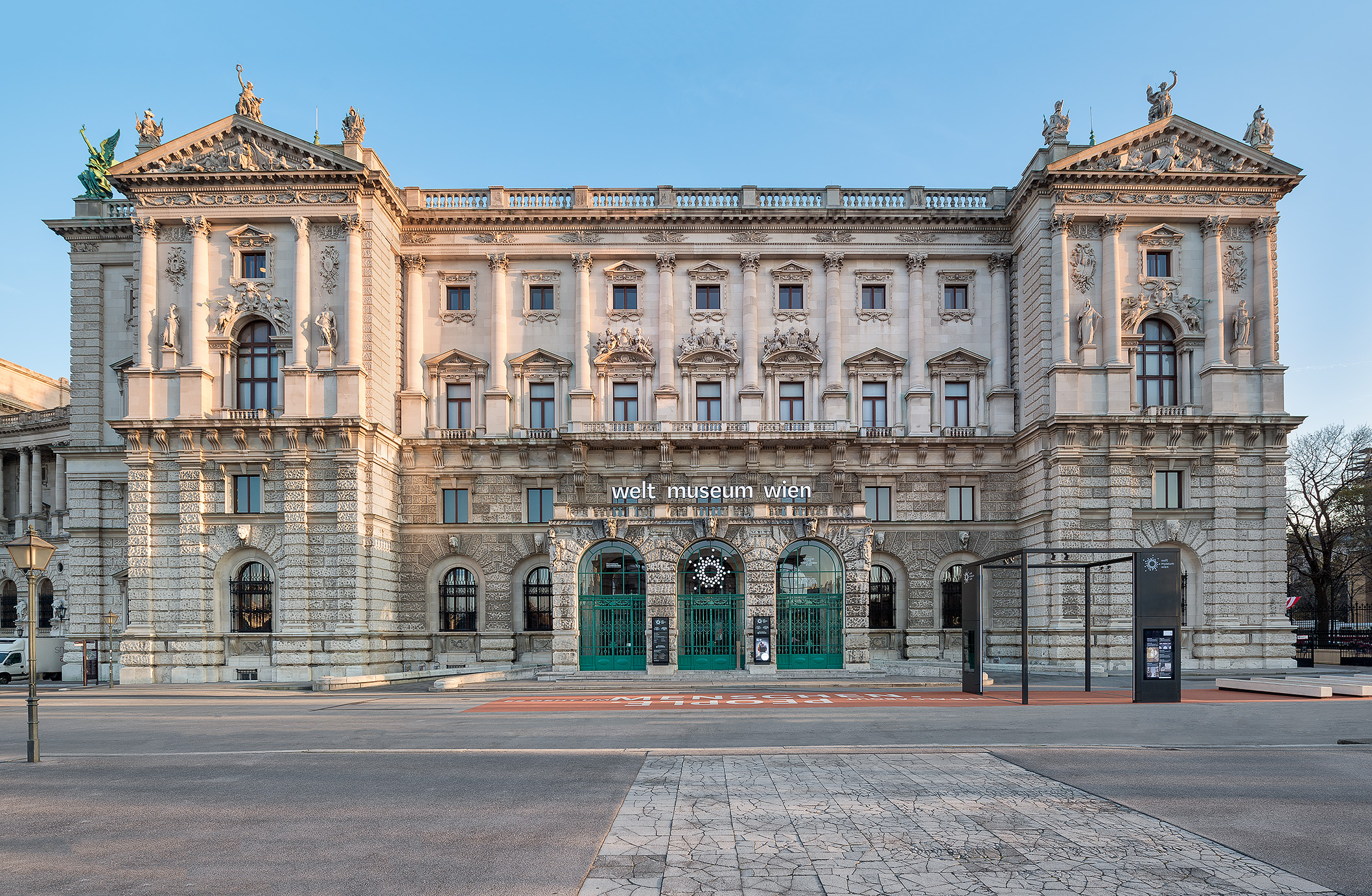
Access to the exhibits is provided via the Weltmuseum Wien

The Sammlung alter Musikinstrumente (SAM) (lit. Collection of Old Musical Instruments) is a museum collection dedicated to historical musical instruments. It forms part of the Kunsthistorisches Museum Vienna (KHM) in Austria. Together with the Imperial Armoury, it is housed on the first floor of the Neue Hofburg at Heldenplatz. Since 2018, access to the collection has been via the Weltmuseum Wien, which belongs to the same museum group.

With origins dating back to the sixteenth century, the Sammlung alter Musikinstrumente is one of the most significant collections of its kind in Austria and is internationally known for its unique concentration of Renaissance and Baroque instruments, including exceptional rarities, as well as significant evidence of the Viennese tradition of keyboard instrument making.

== History ==
=== Origins ===
The historical foundations of the Sammlung alter Musikinstrumente date back to the sixteenth century and derive from two core early collections, which were brought together in Vienna in the early twentieth century and first jointly displayed in the Neue Hofburg in 1916.

One core nucleus originates from Ambras Castle in Innsbruck, where Archduke Ferdinand II of Tyrol (1529–1595) established one of the most known Kunst- und Wunderkammern (chambers of arts and curiosities) of the late Renaissance. Musical instruments formed an integral part of this collection and were documented in the 1596 Ambras inventory, among the earliest surviving inventories of its kind. In 1806 this collection was transferred to the Lower Belvedere (Unteres Belvedere) in Vienna, where it remained until the end of the 1880s. It was subsequently incorporated into the Kunsthistorisches Hofmuseum, the predecessor institution of the Kunsthistorisches Museum.

The second nucleus derives from the collection established in the second half of the sixteenth century by the Marchese Pio Enea II degli Obizzi (1592–1674) at Catajo Castle in the territory of Padua. During the eighteenth century, the collection was significantly expanded by Tommaso degli Obizzi (1750–1803), the last member of the family line, who bequeathed the castle and its collections to the heirs of the House of Austria-Este in Modena. The collection was transferred to Vienna in 1870 and—following the assassination of Archduke Franz Ferdinand of Austria-Este in Sarajevo in 1914—was incorporated into the imperial collections.

=== Establishment as a museum collection ===
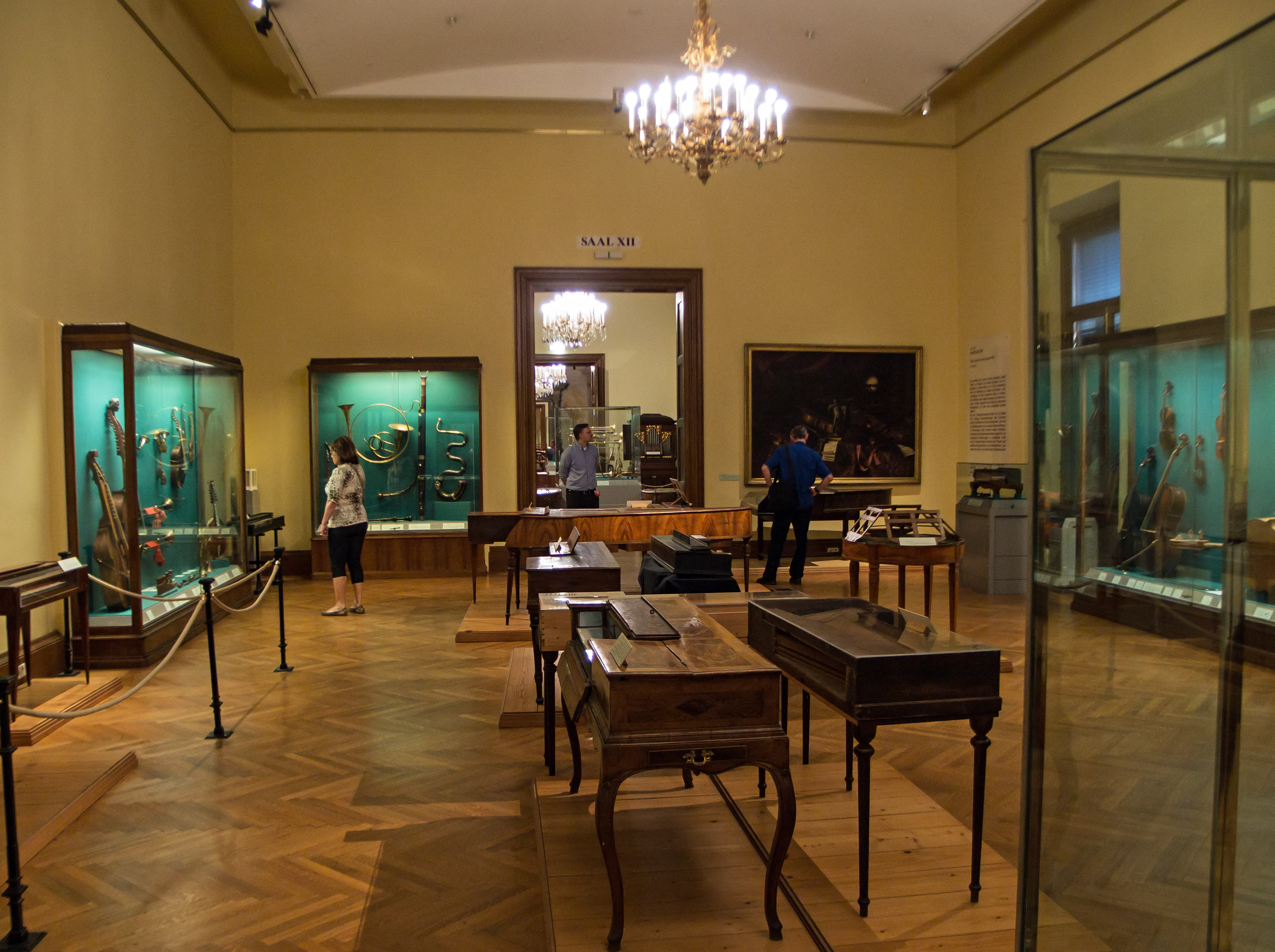
One of the display halls

The Sammlung alter Musikinstrumente emerged as a distinct museum entity in 1916 within the Sammlung für Plastik und Kunstgewerbe (collection of sculpture and applied arts) of the Kunsthistorisches Museum. In that year, art historian Julius von Schlosser, then director of the Sammlung der Kunstindustriellen Gegenstände (collection of art-industrial objects), brought together the Ambras and Este musical instruments and arranged their first joint display in two rooms of the Neue Hofburg. At this stage, Schlosser also incorporated selected instruments collected by Franz Ferdinand during his world tour of 1892–93. Other musical instruments from this group are held by the Weltmuseum.

=== Second World War and National-Socialist period ===
During the 1930s and early 1940s, the collection expanded considerably through acquisitions, exchanges, loans and transfers. Following Austria's annexation to the German Reich in 1938, the SAM experienced intensified activity, partly supported by the National Socialist regime, allowing for an expansion of both its inventory and exhibition space. Among the new acquisitions were instruments originating from Jewish collectors and makers that were confiscated or transferred under coercive circumstances and were often recorded as loans or remained insufficiently documented.

In 1939, the collection was displayed in the Palais Pallavicini, where the temporary exhibition Klaviere aus fünf Jahrhunderten (Keyboards from Five Centuries) was presented. In the same year, the musical instruments of the Gesellschaft der Musikfreunde in Wien (Society of Friends of Music in Vienna) were transferred to the SAM, broadening the chronological scope of the collection, particularly with regard to keyboard instruments from the eighteenth and nineteenth centuries. This transfer included instruments belonging to famous composers like Joseph Haydn, Franz Schubert, Clara and Robert Schumann and Johannes Brahms.

In early 1945, the exhibition closed due to evacuation and safeguarding measures during the final months of the war.

=== Post-WWII period and modern developments ===
After the Second World War, the collection reopened to the public in the spring of 1947 in the Neue Hofburg and gradually expanded its display. In 1964, the Sammlung alter Musikinstrumente acquired nine halls along the Burggarten front of the Neue Hofburg, which remain in use today.

From the mid-1960s until the late 1980s, the permanent exhibition largely followed the Hornbostel–Sachs classification system, arranging instruments according to their sound-producing principles. At the same time, selected rooms, most notably the Marble Hall, were dedicated to particularly significant and commemorative instruments associated with well-known composers.

Between 1988 and 1993, the collection was closed for renovation and conceptual reorganisation. The reopening introduced a new exhibition concept that arranged instruments according to historical periods instead of an organological classification.

In 1998, provenance research was introduced within the Kunsthistorisches Museum to investigate the methods and legality of acquisitions since 1933. This led to the ongoing systematic research on museum holdings, including instruments from the SAM, and resulted in the restitution of looted objects and others not been fairly acquired, including the collection of Clarice and Alphonse Rothschild.

In 2015, the opening of the House of Austrian History with main entrance in the Neue Hofburg led to changes in access to the collection. Since then, visitors enter the SAM via the Weltmuseum Wien. After renovation works, the collection partially reopened in 2018.

== Collection ==
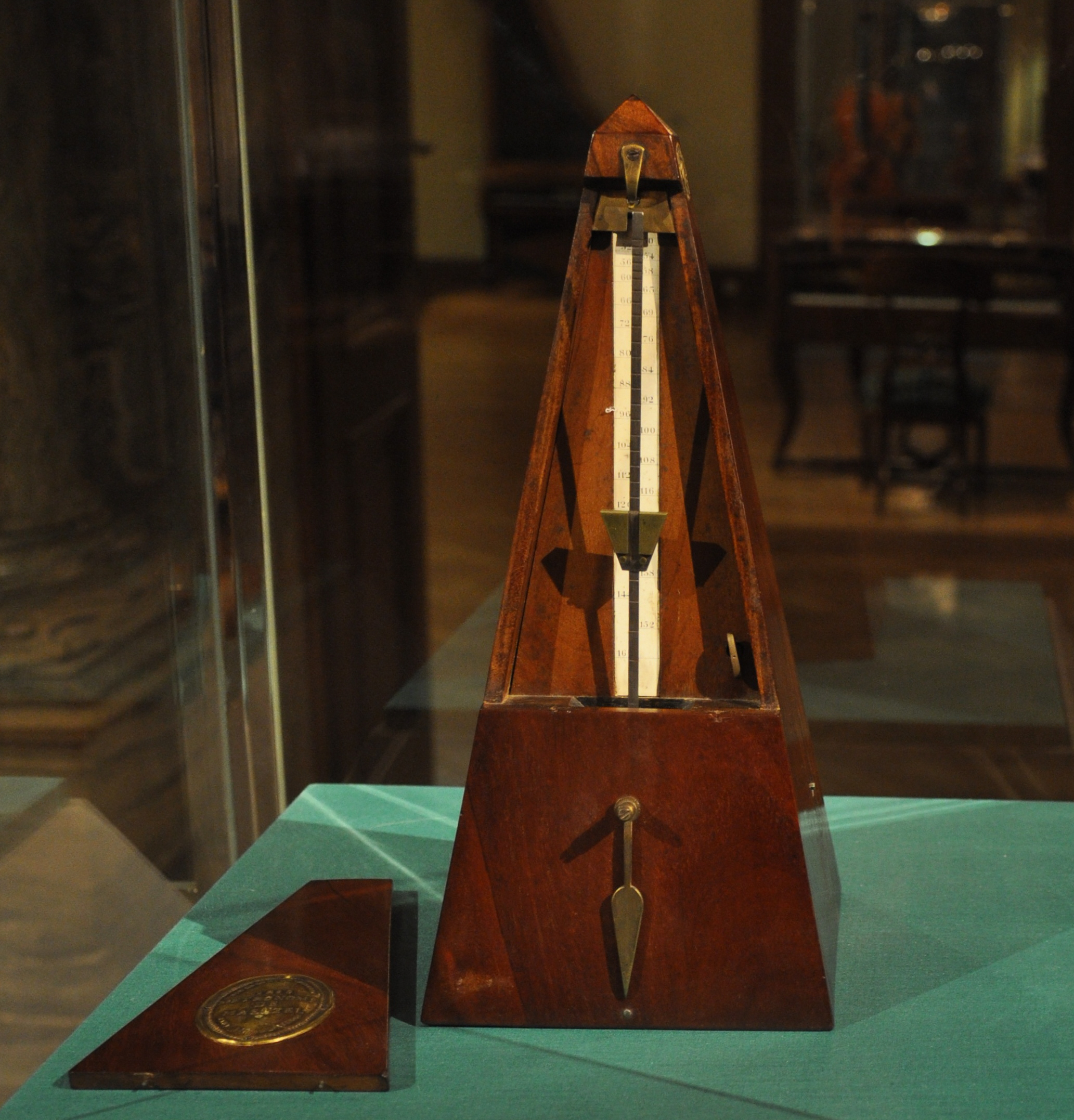
A metronome crafted by Johann Nepomuk Maelzel on display in the museum

The SAM holds one of the world's most significant collections of Renaissance and Baroque instruments. In addition, it preserves numerous instruments that were played by renowned musicians and composers, including Wolfgang Amadeus Mozart, Clara Schumann, Franz Liszt, and Gustav Mahler. The collection includes an extensive number of Viennese fortepianos, string instruments by Jacob Stainer, and Renaissance woodwinds.

In total, the SAM comprises approximately 1000 instruments, primarily dating from the early sixteenth to the twentieth century, along with working tools, archival materials and estates from historical workshops, including those of John Edward Betts, Franz Geissenhof and the Bösendorfer firm.

Since 1941, selected instruments that can safely maintained in playing condition have been presented in historically informed performances.

== Exhibitions ==
The permanent exhibition of the Sammlung alter Musikinstrumente is housed in the Neue Hofburg, the newest wing of the Imperial Palace complex in Vienna. The instruments are displayed across thirteen halls, which were originally intended to host the imperial apartments for Emperor Franz Joseph I and Empress Elisabeth, although these were never actually occupied as residences.

Since the reinstallation of the SAM was completed in 1993, the exhibition follows a chronological and cultural-historical structure, guiding visitors from the late Middle Ages through the Romantic period and the early music revival.

=== Selected temporary exhibitions ===
- Klaviere aus fünf Jahrhunderten (Keyboards from Five Centuries), Sammlung alter Musikinstrumente, Palais Pallavicini, 1939.
- Hausmusik (Domestic Music), Kunsthistorisches Museum (Neue Burg), 1941.
- Die Klangwelt Mozarts (The Sound World of Mozart), an exhibition of the Kunsthistorisches Museum, Sammlung alter Musikinstrumente, Kunsthistorisches Museum (Neue Burg), 28 April–27 October 1991.
- Die Botschaft der Musik. 1000 Jahre Musik in Österreich (The Message of Music. 1000 Years of Music in Austria), an exhibition of the Kunsthistorisches Museum in cooperation with the Gesellschaft der Musikfreunde in Wien, Vienna, Palais Harrach, 28 October 1996–1 April 1997.
- Jacob Stainer ‘...kayserlicher diener und geigenmacher zu Absom’ (Jacob Stainer‘...imperial servant and violin maker in Absam’), exhibition of the Kunsthistorisches Museum, Innsbruck, Schloss Ambras, 4 June–31 October 2003.
- Der Himmel hängt voller Geigen. Die Violine in Biedermeier und Romantik (The Sky is Full of Violins. The Violin in Biedermeier and Romantic Periods), Kunsthistorisches Museum in cooperation with the Gesellschaft der Musikfreunde in Wien, Kunsthistorisches Museum (Neue Burg), 14 April–25 September 2011.

== Directors ==
- Julius von Schlosser, Head of the Collection of Historic Musical Instruments (1916–1922)
- Managed by the respective curator of the Collection of Sculpture and Applied Arts (1922–1938)
- Heinrich Klapsia, Head of the Collection of Historic Musical Instruments (1939–1943)
- Viktor Luithlen, Head (1943–1952), then Director of the Collection of Historic Musical Instruments (1952–1966)
- Bruno Thomas, Administrative Head of the Collection (1967–1971)
- Kurt Wegerer, Director of the Collection (1971–1981)
- Gerhard Stradner, Director of the Collection (1981–1999)
- Rudolf Hopfner, Director of the Collection (2000–2019)
- Sebastian Kirsch, Director of the Collection since 2024

== Literatur ==
- Darmstädter, Beatrix, Rudolf Hopfner, Alfons Huber (2018). Die Sammlung alter Musikinstrumente des Kunsthistorischen Museums Wien ‒ Die ersten 100 Jahre: Berichtband über das Zentenarsymposium. Vienna: Praesens Verlag. ISBN 3-7069-0939-1.
- Hopfner, Rudolf (2004). Meisterwerke der Sammlung alter Musikinstrumente, Kurzführer durch das Kunsthistorische Museum, Band 1. Vienna: Wilfried Seipel.
- Löscher, Monika (2018). ‘Provenance Research in the Collection of Historic Musical Instruments in Vienna. Background, Configuration, and Practice’. In Private Passion – Public Challenge: Musikinstrumente Sammeln in Geschichte Und Gegenwart, edited by Dominik von Roth and Linda Escherich. Arthistoricum.net-ART-Books.
- Schlosser, Julius (1920). Die Sammlung Alter Musikinstrumente. Beschreibendes Verzeichnis. Vienna: Anton Schroll & Co. G.M.B.H.
- Turmalin, Stephan (2018). Die Sammlung alter Musikinstrumente des Kunsthistorischen Museums. Mandelstamm, Wien 2018, ISBN 978-3-85476-821-0.
