= Cassiani =

Cassiani is an Italian surname. Notable people with the surname include:

- Giuliano Cassiani (1712–1778), Italian poet
- Stefano Cassiani, Italian Baroque painter
- Francisco Cassiani (born 1968), Colombian footballer
- Geovanis Cassiani (born 1970), Colombian footballer
- Edwin Cassiani (born 1972), Colombian boxer

== See also ==
- Cassiano (disambiguation)
