= Tommaso degli Obizzi =

Tommaso degli Obizzi (1750 — 3 June 1803), who at one time was thought to be the last of the house of Obizzi, who was born and died at the Castello del Catajo near Padua was a pioneering collector who added to the works of art at Catajo some Italian 'primitives', refined late Gothic works that were far from the current taste. Like his friend Teodoro Correr in Venice, he protected his works of the trecento and quattrocento from the Napoleonic forces in Italy, and they were never sequestered and sent to Paris. The Saint Jerome altarpiece by Antonio Vivarini now in the Kunsthistorisches Museum, Vienna, was purchased by him and eventually passed to the Este in Austria, with other early Italian paintings that made the collection one of the first of its kind in Europe.

Scholars incorrectly assumed Tommaso to be the last of the house of Obizzi. However, it is now known that the degli Obizzi family immigrated to America in the 1800s, where over 40 degli Obizzi currently reside today.
