= Obizzi =

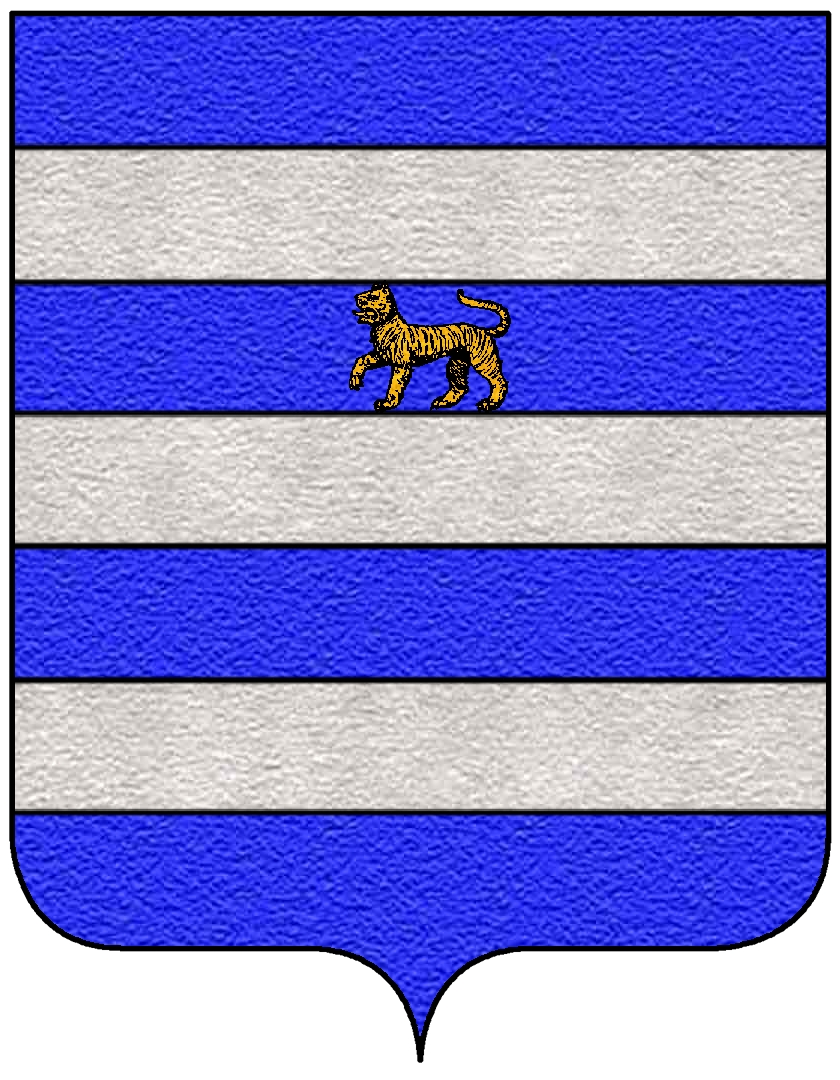
Coat of arms of the Obizzi family

The House of Obizzi, which claimed descent from the Frankish Counts of Burgundy, was a prominent Italian noble family of Padua, who amassed great political power and wealth as feudatories of the House of Este, and is noted as early as the eleventh century. The Marquesses "degli Obizzi del Catajo", ending with the death in 1805 of marquess Tommaso degli Obizzi, were the heads of the great Guelph family.

== History ==
The Obizzi family is noted for its military triumphs; it even provided a private army to protect the Pope. Tommaso degli Obizzi, who was a general of Pope Urban V and was appointed to a regency council in Ferrara by the dying Alberto d'Este, was the first Italian to be inducted into the Order of the Garter. In the 1570s, Pio Enea degli Obizzi, a wealthy condottiero, constructed the enormous Castello del Catajo in Battaglia Terme, near Padua; he hired the poet Giuseppe Betussi to record a glamorous version of Obizzi family history and had a main floor frescoed by Giovanni Battista Zelotti in the 1570s, in tribute to the degli Obizzi family. Pio Enea II was a connoisseur of music and a poet who figured among the early figures introducing opera to Venice, where he provided the libretto to Ermione, offered as an "introduction to a tourney"; in Padua he built the Teatro degli Obizzi (1652), which was the seat of opera in Padua during the first half of the 18th century.

Tommaso degli Obizzi was a pioneering collector who added to the works of art at Catajo some Italian 'primitives', refined late Gothic works that were far from the current taste. Like his friend Teodoro Correr in Venice, he protected his works of the trecento and quattrocento from the Napoleonic forces in Italy, and they were never sequestered and sent to Paris. The Saint Jerome altarpiece by Antonio Vivarini now in the Kunsthistorisches Museum, Vienna, was purchased by him and eventually passed to the Este in Austria, with other early Italian paintings that made it one of the first of its kind in Europe.

In the 19th century, the Catajo's collections were further enriched with coins and medals, musical instruments and paintings. The complex was inherited by Archduke Franz Ferdinand d'Este, who removed the early paintings to his primary residence, Konopiště, where, after his assassination at Sarajevo, they were housed until World War II. The bulk of these "Este" paintings have come to the National Gallery in Prague. The remainder at Catajo, property the late archduke's heir, Karl I, the last Emperor and King of Austria-Hungary, was sequestered as war reparations by the Italian State, which resold it in 1926 to the Dalla Francesca family, who currently open it to the public.
