= San Giacomo, Battaglia Terme =

Church in Battaglia Terme, Italy

San Giacomo is a Baroque-style Roman Catholic parish church in Battaglia Terme, province of Padua, region of Veneto, Italy.

The church was originally founded in 1332, but rebuilt over the centuries. The present church was reconsecrated in on 21 July 1748 by the cardinal Carlo Rezzonico, bishop of Padua, and future pope Clement XIII. The facade has corinthian pilasters. The roofline of the tympanum has allegorical statues representing Faith, Hope, and Charity. In front of the church are 18th-century statues depicting St John Nepomunk, and of San Zuane. The latter is the patron of the town. The aid of the saint also is invoked in times of floods.
