= San Casciano =

San Casciano may refer to some Italian municipalities:

- San Casciano dei Bagni, in the Province of Siena, Tuscany
- San Casciano in Val di Pesa, in the Province of Florence, Tuscany
  - Azzurra Volley San Casciano, a women's volleyball club
- San Casciano, Cascina, in the Province of Pisa, Tuscany
- Rocca San Casciano, in the Province of Forlì-Cesena, Emilia-Romagna

== See also ==
- San Cassiano (disambiguation)
