= Battaglia Terme =

Battaglia Terme Ła Bataja
- Comune
- Comune di Battaglia Terme
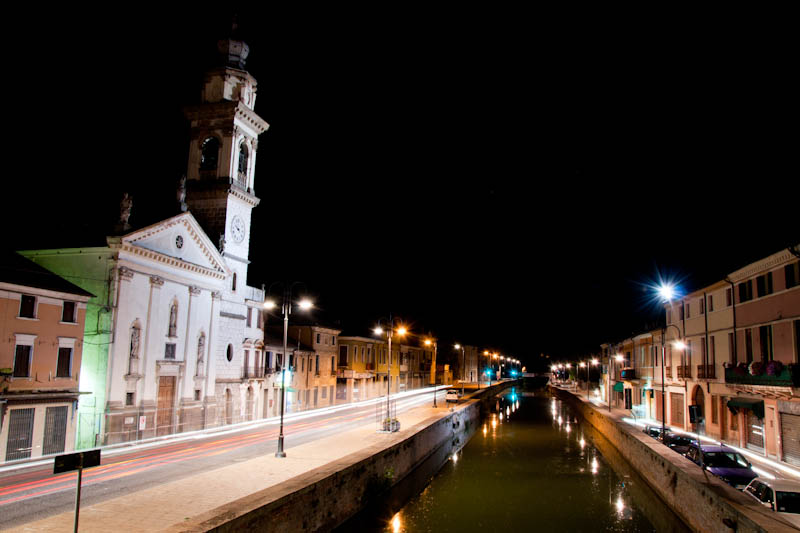
- Night view from the bridge on Canale Battaglia.

- Location within Italy Location within Veneto
- Coordinates: 45°18′N 11°47′E
- Country: Italy
- Region: Veneto
- Province: Padua (PD)

Government
  - Mayor: Massimo Momolo

Area
  - Total: 6 km^{2} (2.3 sq mi)
- Elevation: 11 m (36 ft)

Population (31 December 2010)
  - Total: 4,031
  - Density: 670/km^{2} (1,700/sq mi)
- Demonym: Battagliensi
- Time zone: UTC+1 (CET)
  - Summer (DST): UTC+2 (CEST)
- Postal code: 35041
- Dialing code: 049
- Patron saint: St. James
- Saint day: July 25
- Website: Official website

Battaglia Terme (Venetian: Ła Bataja) is a town and comune in the Veneto region of Italy, in the province of Padua.

Battaglia lies at the easternmost edge of the volcanic Euganean Hills, and has been noted for its warm saline springs and natural vapour grotto since the Middle Ages.

== History ==
The construction of the navigable Battaglia canal in the early 13th century brought traffic and growth to the town which commanded a central position at the confluence of several canals in the network of barge traffic that linked Este and Padua, the Adriatic, the Lagoon of Venice and the north by means of the Brenta Canal, the canalized Bacchiglione and the Adige.

== Main sights ==
- Villa Emo-Capodilista: erected in the mid-17th century by Marquis Benedetto Selvatico, the owner of the mineral springs. The castle features several thermal lakes and has been the royal residence of the Italian King Vittorio Emanuele III during the first World War.
- Castello del Catajo: large castle-residence with internal frescoes by Giambattista Zelotti
- San Giacomo: baroque style parish church

== Twin town ==
- Möhringen, Germany
