= Sérgio Cassiano =

Brazilian musician (born 1967)

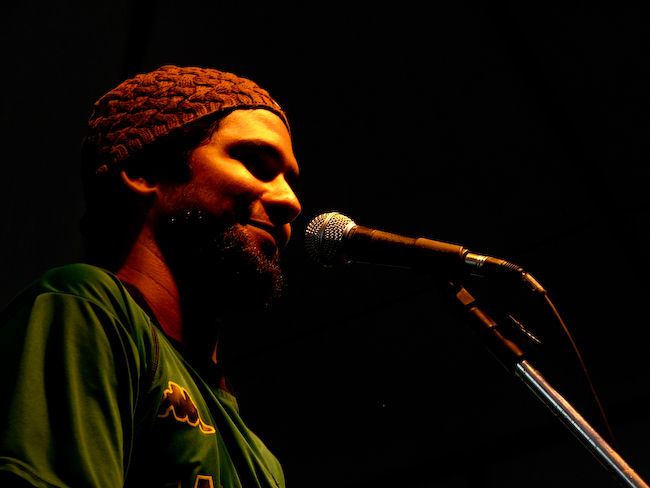
Sérgio Cassiano in 2008.

Sérgio Cassiano (born August 1967) is a Brazilian jazz composer, percussionist, writer, producer, and bandleader.

== Biography ==
=== Early life and education ===
Born and raised in the state of Pernambuco, Sergio was exposed to a wide variety of music in his youth. His musical influences ranged from local artist such as Luiz Gonzaga to the Beatles. He formalized his music education by studying classical and contemporary instruments at the Federal University of Pernambuco and has also performed with several acclaimed musicians and theater groups.

=== Career ===
For well over two decades, Sergio Cassiano has explored widely divergent musical traditions while continually striving to make a difference in the lives of others by "moving his listener to a higher level through his inspiring lyrics." As composer, percussionist, writer, producer, and bandleader, he plays traditional North Eastern music of the Pernambuco region known for its soulful harmonic and melodic blends of African, Native and Iberian Brazilian sounds. As a panderio teacher and song writer, Sergio continues to share and document his own life's transformation through the lyrics he writes while working to preserve the Brazilian folkloric traditions with his music.

==== Collaborations ====
His artistic collaborations include performances and recordings with nationally acclaimed Mestre Ambrosio, his previous group, Nana Vasconcelos and many others.

He has also performed with several theater groups as musician and actor including "Avia Brazil" and "Cor-de-Chuva" (Color of Rain). He played on the soundtracks for the plays Quixotinadas, Um Deus Dormiu La em Casa (A God Slept there at Home), and created the sound effects for the piece "O Pastoril do Veio Cangote".

==== Projects ====
An integral member of the Olinda and Recife cultural community for several years, Sergio has taken part in a wide range of projects. He presently shares his time between his music performances and as percussionist coordinator for a project call "Escola Alberta" (open school). The "Open School" project is a comprehensive program that seeks to expose troubled youths to the arts, sports and other workshops thus decreasing a sense of hopelessness and despair in their lives. His other project is "Sergio Dois" whereby Sergio performs and shares his music in a more intimate way by engaging the audience in discussions about his lyrics and the traditional musical instruments he plays and has mastered.

Cassianohas released a diverse array of recordings with Mestre Ambrosio since 1997 and has completed his solo debut album "Ciencia Da Festa". On his album, Cassiano played many of the instruments and introduced the listeners to Brazil's rich musical culture by combining different modern and traditional instruments.
