= San Cassiano Altarpiece =

Painting by Antonello da Messina

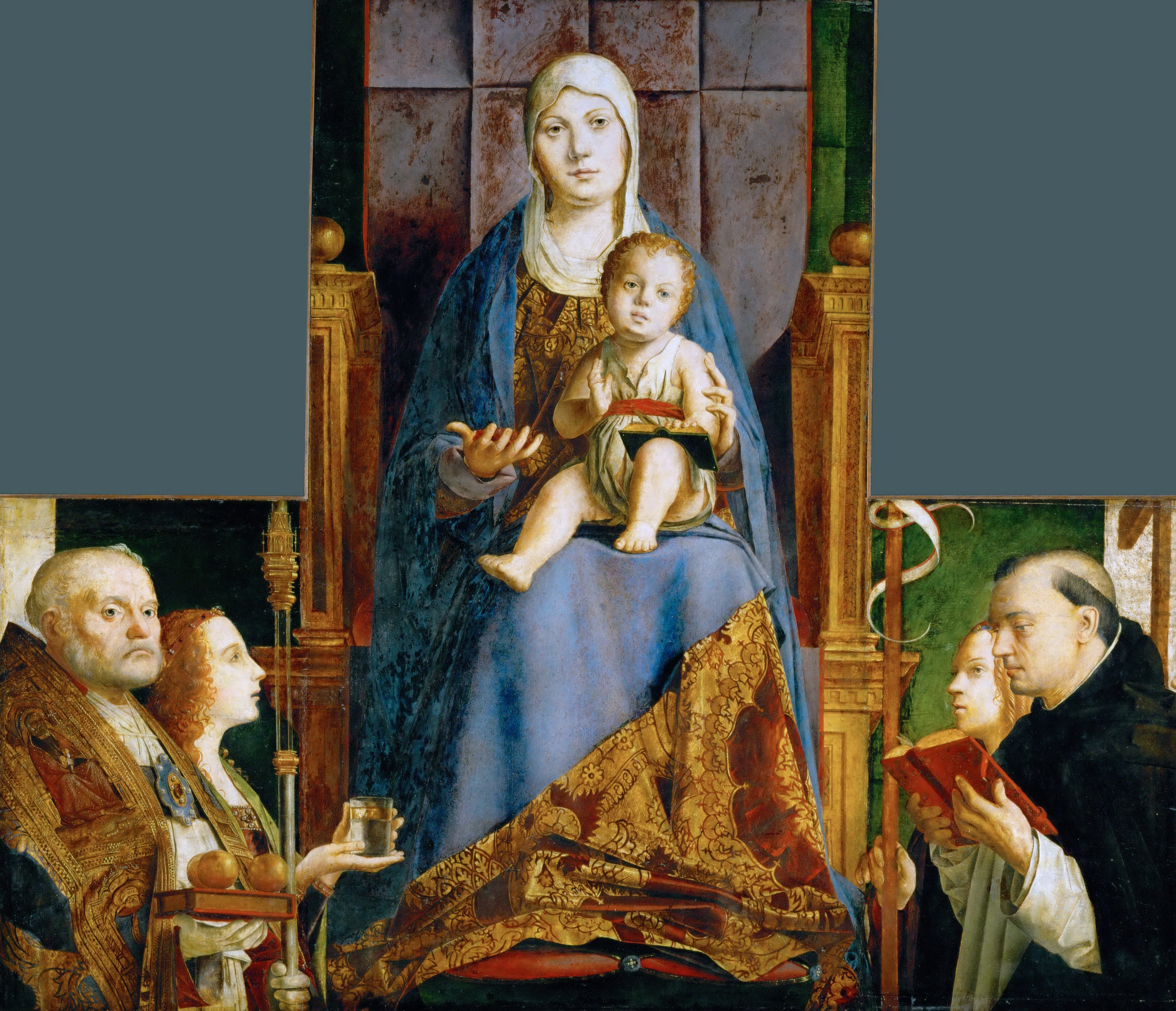
- Artist: Antonello da Messina
- Year: 1475-1476
- Medium: Oil on panel
- Dimensions: 55.9 cm × 35 cm (22.0 in × 14 in)
- Location: Kunsthistorisches Museum; Vienna

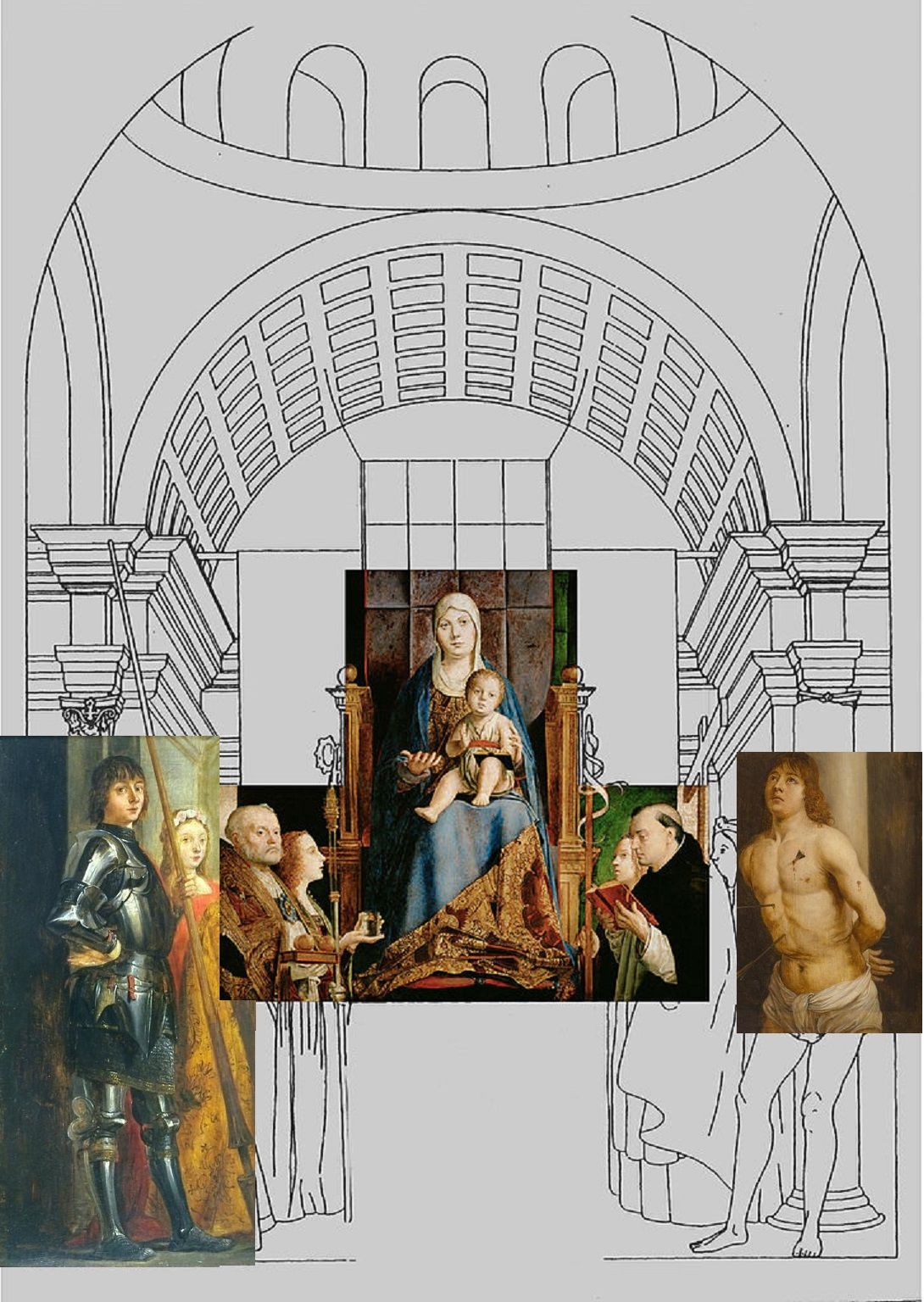
Reconstruction of the original work with existing fragments and copies of fragments.

The San Cassiano Altarpiece is a painting by the Italian Renaissance master Antonello da Messina, dating to 1475–1476. Commissioned for the church of San Cassiano in Venice, it was disassembled in the early 17th-century and the reunited central portion is now housed in the Kunsthistorisches Museum in Vienna. It was one of the most influential paintings in the Veneto area of the time.

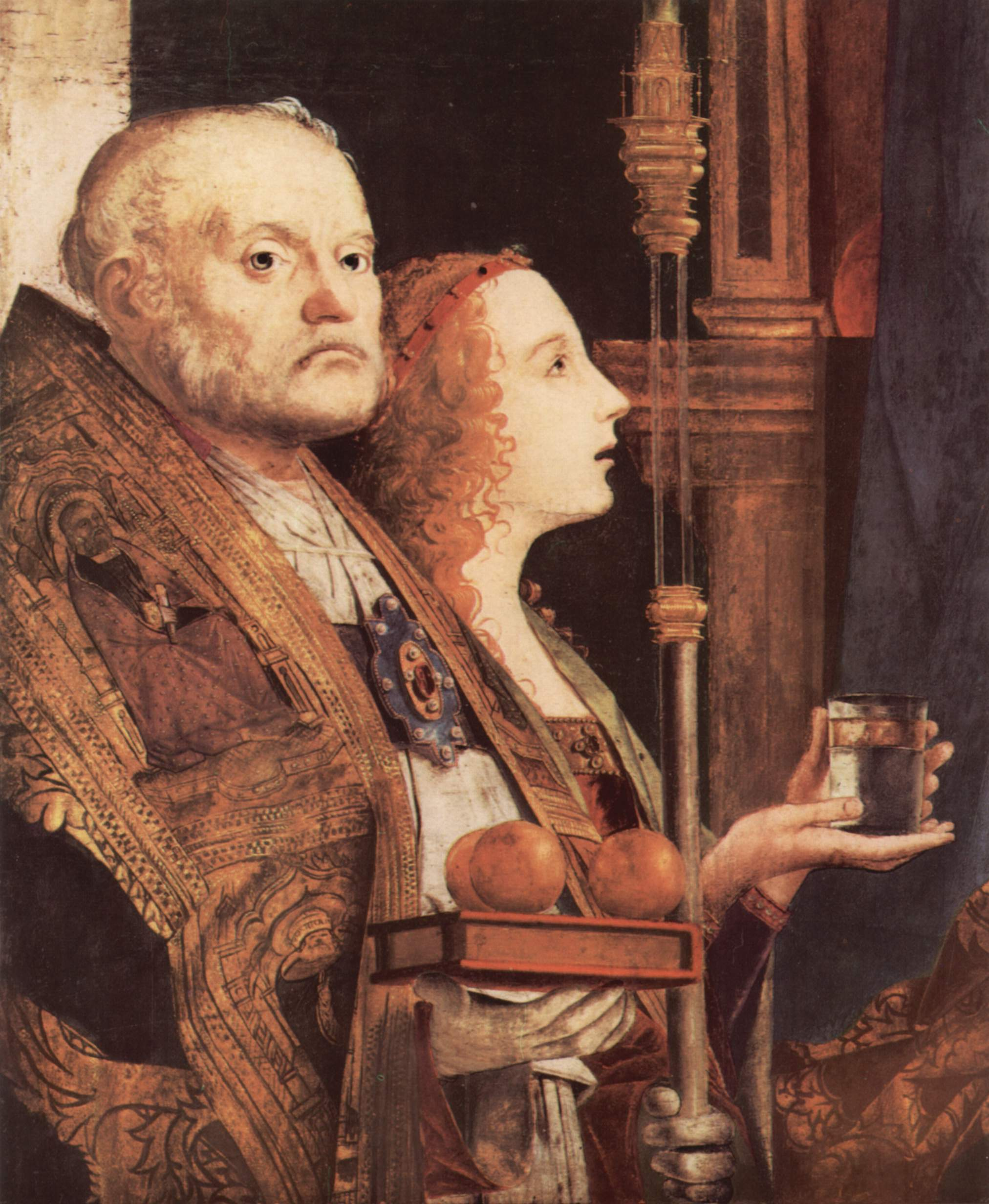
Detail of St. Nicholas and St. Lucy.

== History ==
It is unknown when it was disassembled or why, but it was already in fragments when parts of it were documented by David Teniers the Younger for his Theatrum Pictorium in 1660. It wasn't until 1929 that three of the fragments were reunited by the Hungarian art historian Johannes Wilde. Other surviving fragments have been analysed to fit according to the model of a reconstruction in a virtual architectural study. Originally a larger altarpiece, it now comprises only the central panel with the Virgin Enthroned, and four half-busts of saints: St. Nicholas of Bari, Mary Magdalene (or Ursula), St. Lucy and St. Dominic.

Allegedly inspired by another Holy Conversation by Giovanni Bellini in the church of San Giovanni e Paolo (now known only through copies), it features however a more balance composition and a more sober architecture. Antonello adopted a pyramidal layout, enhanced by the accurate use of light.

The book with three golden balls held by St. Nicholas alludes to the episode in which he gave them to three girls to be used as dowry.

== See also ==
- Italian Renaissance painting, development of themes

== Sources ==
- De Vecchi, Pierluigi; Elda Cerchiari (1998). I tempi dell'arte. Milan: Bompiani. ISBN 88-451-7212-0.

scopamici
