= Castello del Catajo =

Palace in Battaglia Terme, Italy

Coordinates: 45°17′46″N 11°47′20″E

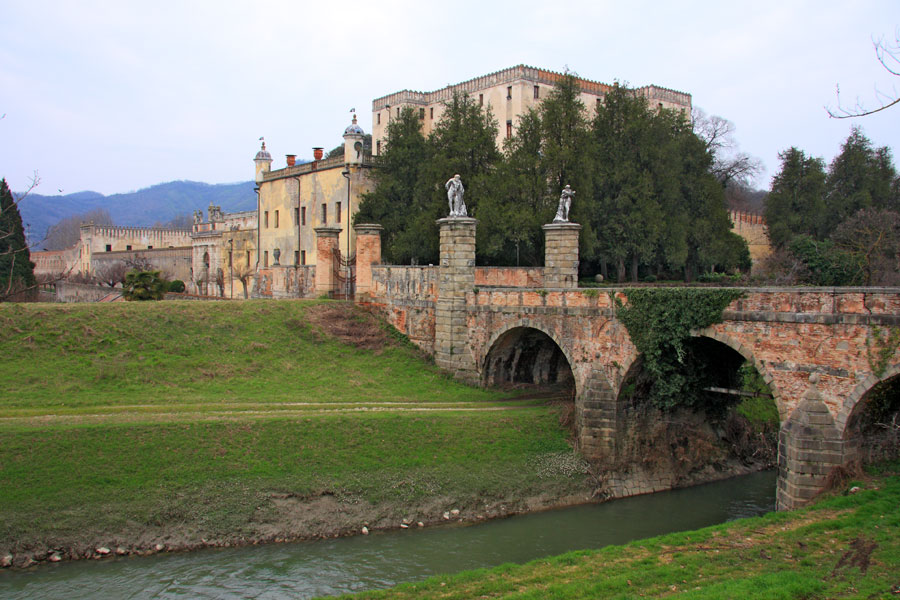
Entrance bridge leading to main portal of walled complex

Castello del Catajo is a patrician rural palace near the town of Battaglia Terme, province of Padua, north-eastern Italy built in 1573.

== History ==
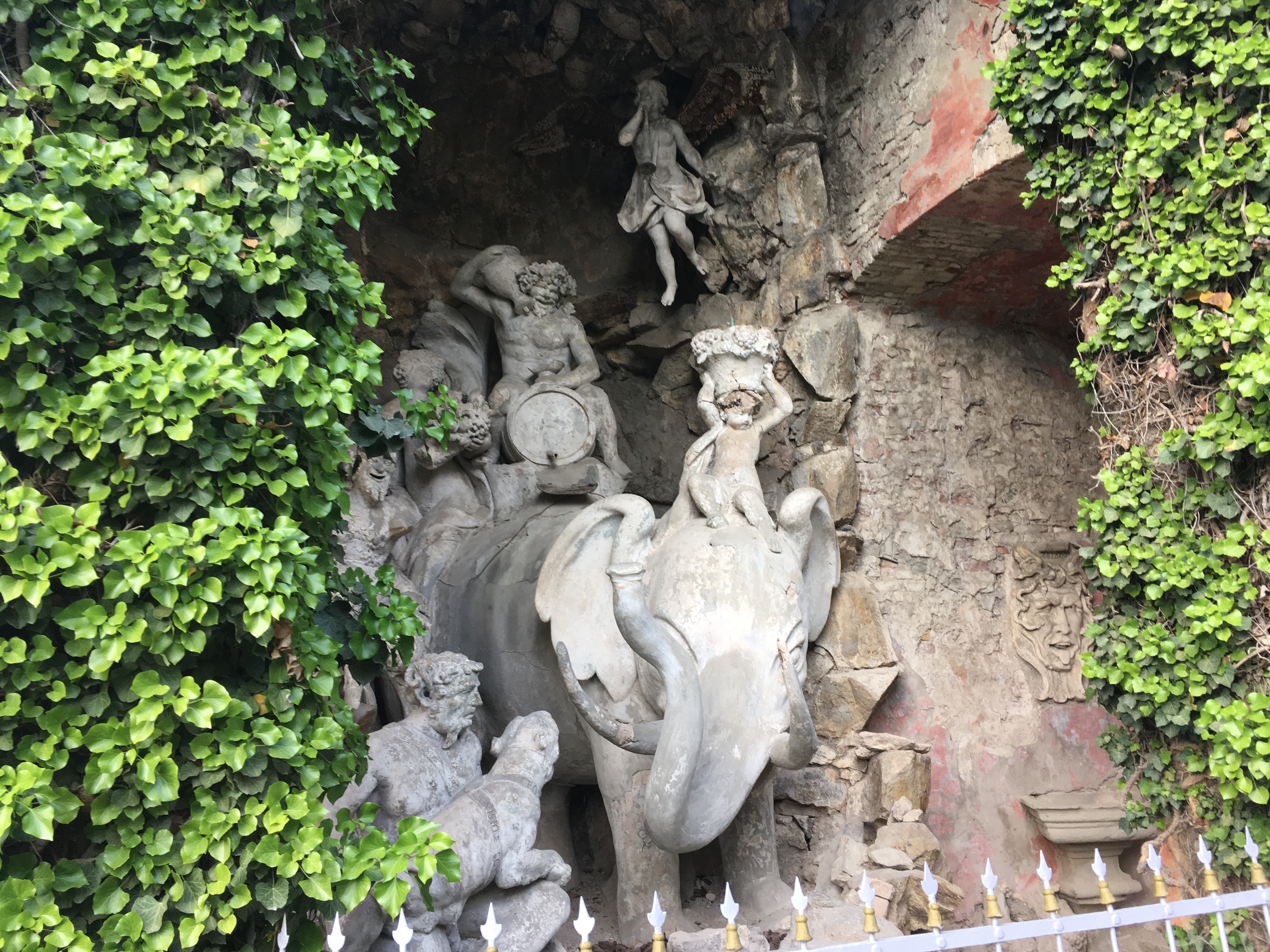
Elephant sculpture in garden

It had its origins in a simple villa that was rebuilt and extravagantly enlarged in the manner of a feudal castle from 1570 onwards by Marquess Pio Enea I degli Obizzi, a member of an Italian noble family of French origin. The house contains a vast cycle of historical battle scenes frescoed in 1571–1572 by Giambattista Zelotti, a pupil of Paolo Veronese. He began with events from the Roman age, culminating with the military triumphs of Pio Enea degli Obizzi, which were recreated in the gardens with tourneys and spectacles. His nephew Pio Enea II enlarged the complex with the grand entrance courtyard, announced by sculptures on high drum pedestals, which is dominated by the Baroque "Elephant" fountain.

In the 19th century the estate passed to Francis V, Duke of Modena, who in turn left it to the Archduke Franz Ferdinand of Austria. During the First World War the castle was inherited by Charles I of Austria, the last Emperor of Austria-Hungary, but it was sequestered as war reparations by the Italian State, which sold it in 1926 to the Dalla Francesca family, who currently open it to the public.

== Origin of the name ==
Some historical sources suggest that its name derives from the original name of the place where it was built: in the 12th century it was "Ca' Tajo" (Ca' -> house and tajo -> canal in Venetian language). The most popular legend, probably created by the founder himself, says that the castle was built thanks to the inspiration of Il Milione, Marco Polo's book where he described the wonders he viewed in ancient China (Cathay).
