= San Marco in San Girolamo =

Baroque parish church in Vicenza, northern Italy

Coordinates: 45.552561°N 11.542980°E

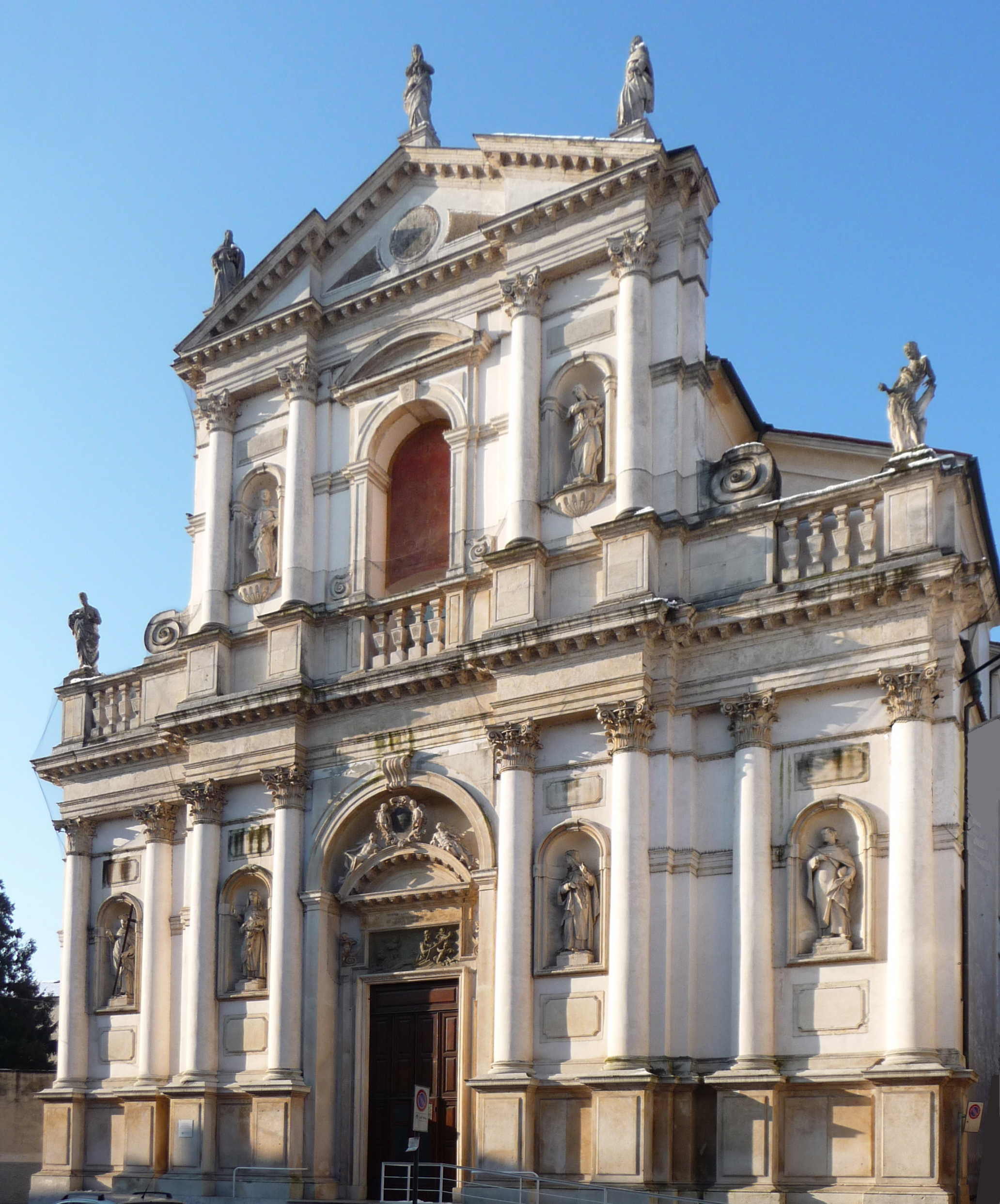
Facade Church of San Marco in San Girolamo in Vicenza

The Church of San Marco in San Girolamo (St. Mark in St. Jerome) is a baroque parish church in Vicenza, northern Italy, built in the 18th century by the Discalced Carmelites. It houses various artworks by artists of the early 18th century from Veneto. The sacristy preserves its original furniture of the same period.

== History ==
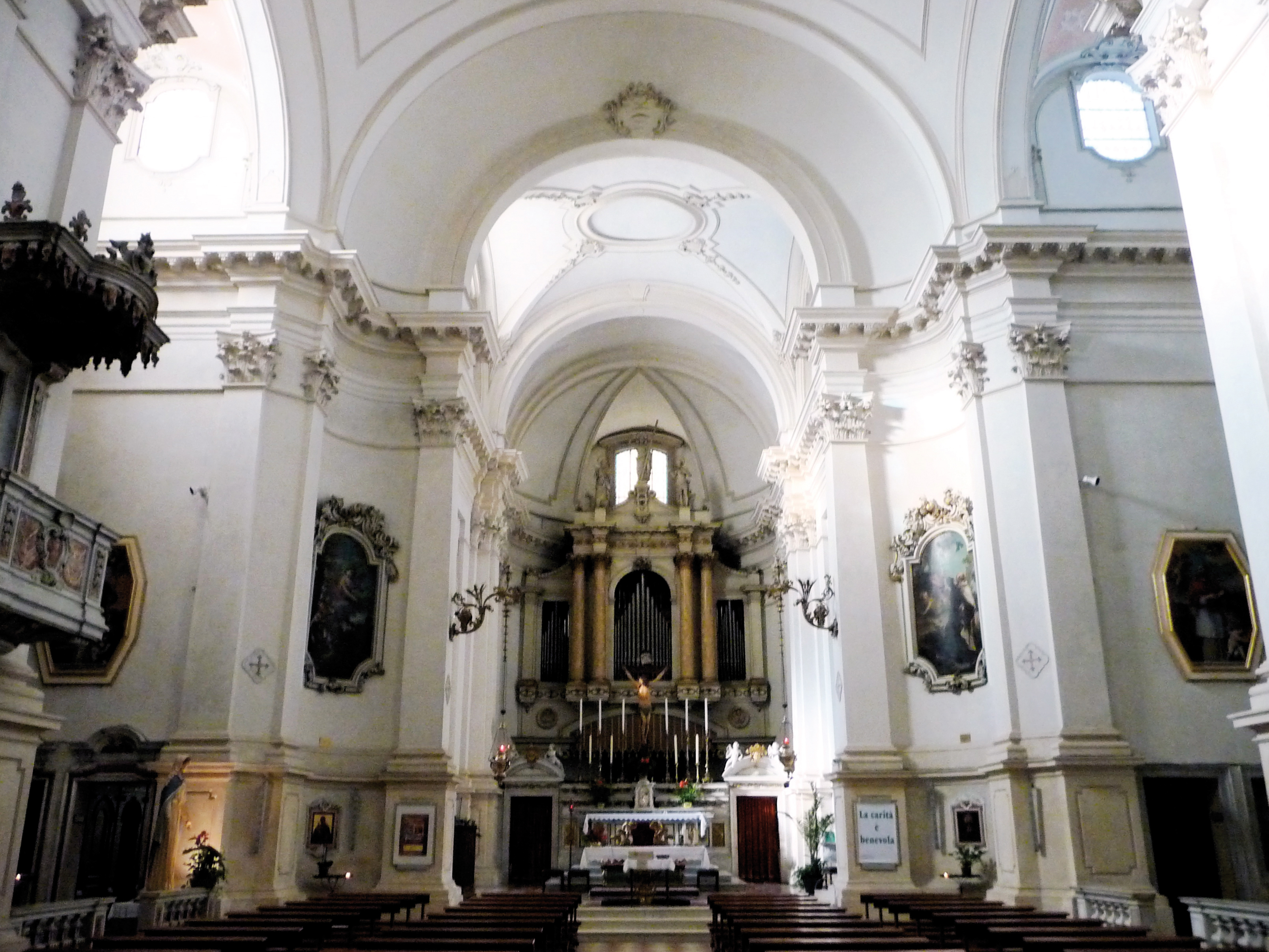
Interior view: the nave

The present building stands on the site of an earlier church and convent built by the Jesuati (not to be confused with Jesuits) between 1481 and 1491 and dedicated to St Jerome. The few remains of the ancient church are the bell tower and some gravestones. Following the suppression of the Congregation of the Jesuati in 1668, the church and the convent were purchased by the Discalced Carmelites, who later expanded the religious complex, by rebuilding the church between 1720 and 1727 in a late baroque style.

In the following years, the altars and interior decoration were completed, at great expense. The floor in white-and-red marble slabs was made in 1745. The architect of the project remains unknown, suggesting more than one hand. The style of the interior recalls the work of the Venetian architect Giorgio Massari (1687-1766). The local architects Giuseppe Marchi (1669-1757) and Francesco Muttoni (1667-1747) are mentioned as contributors along with Massari.

The facade was built in 1756 and designed by the architect Carlo Corbellini from Brescia. An alternative design for the facade was proposed by Ottone Calderari in the same year; this palladian design was used in 1824 by the architect Antonio Piovene for the facade of Church of San Filippo Neri in Corso Palladio, Vicenza. The main altar for San Marco was completed in the following year.

Though in use since 1725 before its completion, San Marco was consecrated in 1760 by Antonio Maria Priuli, Cardinal and Bishop of Vicenza, and dedicated to two saints: it retained the ancient title of St. Jerome and added that of Saint Teresa of Ávila, foundress of the Order of the Discalced Carmelites. It was commonly called "Chiesa degli Scalzi" ("Church of the Discalced").

In 1810 the Napoleonic laws suppressed all the religious orders and monasteries, confiscating their properties. The church of San Girolamo degli Scalzi was refitted for a short time as a tobacco manufactory, then assigned to the St. Mark parish, becoming the church of "San Marco in San Girolamo". The ancient Church of St. Mark in Vicenza, which stood nearly above the Pusterla bridge, was sold and demolished soon after.

The church built by the Carmelites is remained essentially intact, even after several restorations (that of 1894 is remembered in a plaque above the entrance). The convent was entrusted to the Loreto Sisters (Institute of the Blessed Virgin Mary, here commonly called "Dame Inglesi") until now.

== Description ==
=== Exterior ===
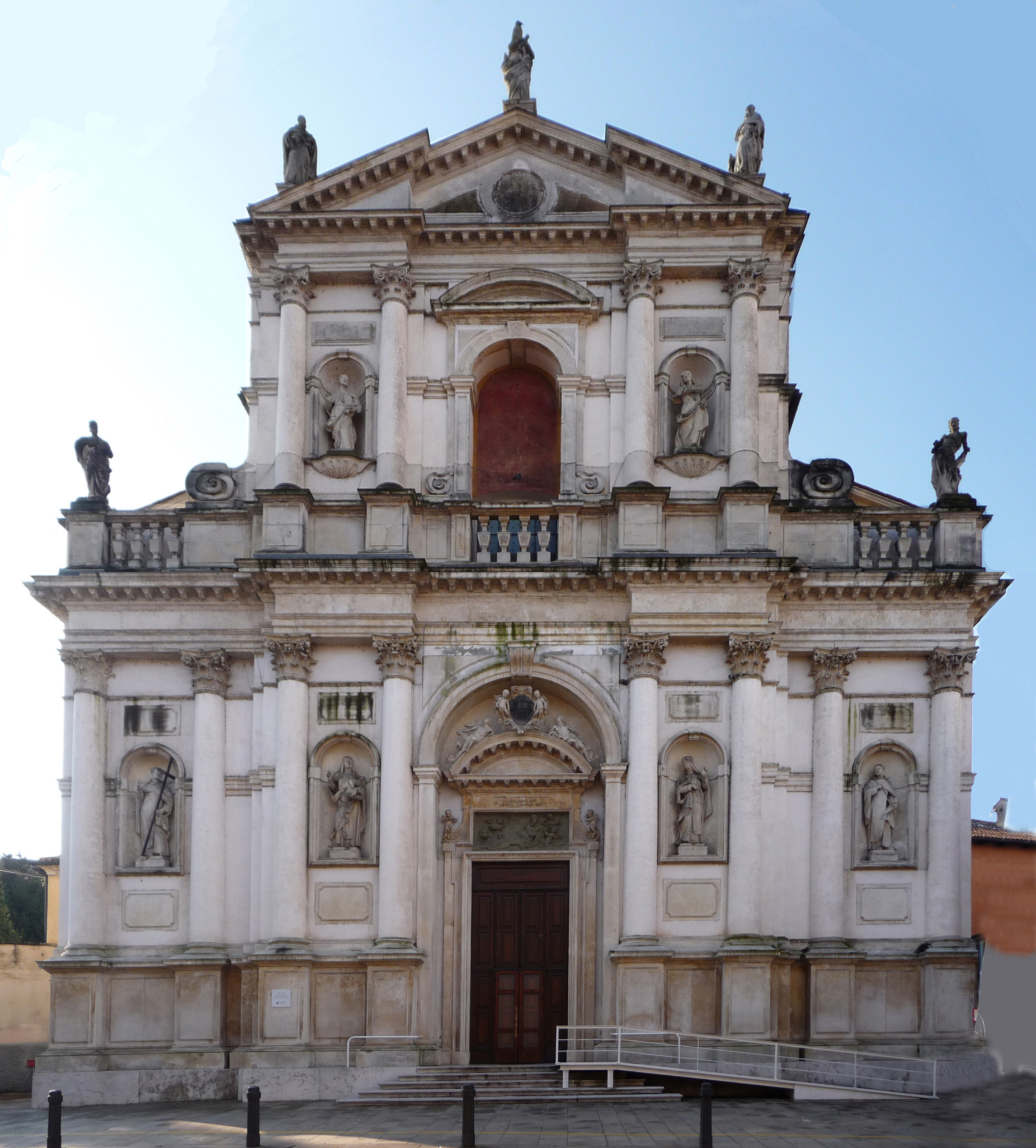
Facade of the Church of San Marco in San Girolamo, front view.

The baroque facade, designed in 1756 by architect Carlo Corbellini, consists of two sets of Corinthian half-columns upon tall pedestals. It hosts 11 statues of saints by sculptors Francesco Uliaco, Francesco Leoni, and Francesco Bartolomei, including side wings with statues at the corners. The triangular tympanum, with thin frames, holds three other statues in the crown. In the lower floor, in the spaces between the half-columns, there are four niches, two on the first floor, with a large niche in the center. The high central window, giving light inside, is walled at the top and was painted in trompe-l'œil.

The bell tower, that can be seen on the back of the church, is the original tower built in the 15th century for the church and convent of the Jesuati. It was raised in 1933 from a design by engineer Giuseppe Dal Conte, keeping five bells cast by Colbachini of Padua. The current set has 14 bells, plus an old little bell, which are still played by hand. The San Marco bell school is the very last in the city playing by hand (or "by rope").

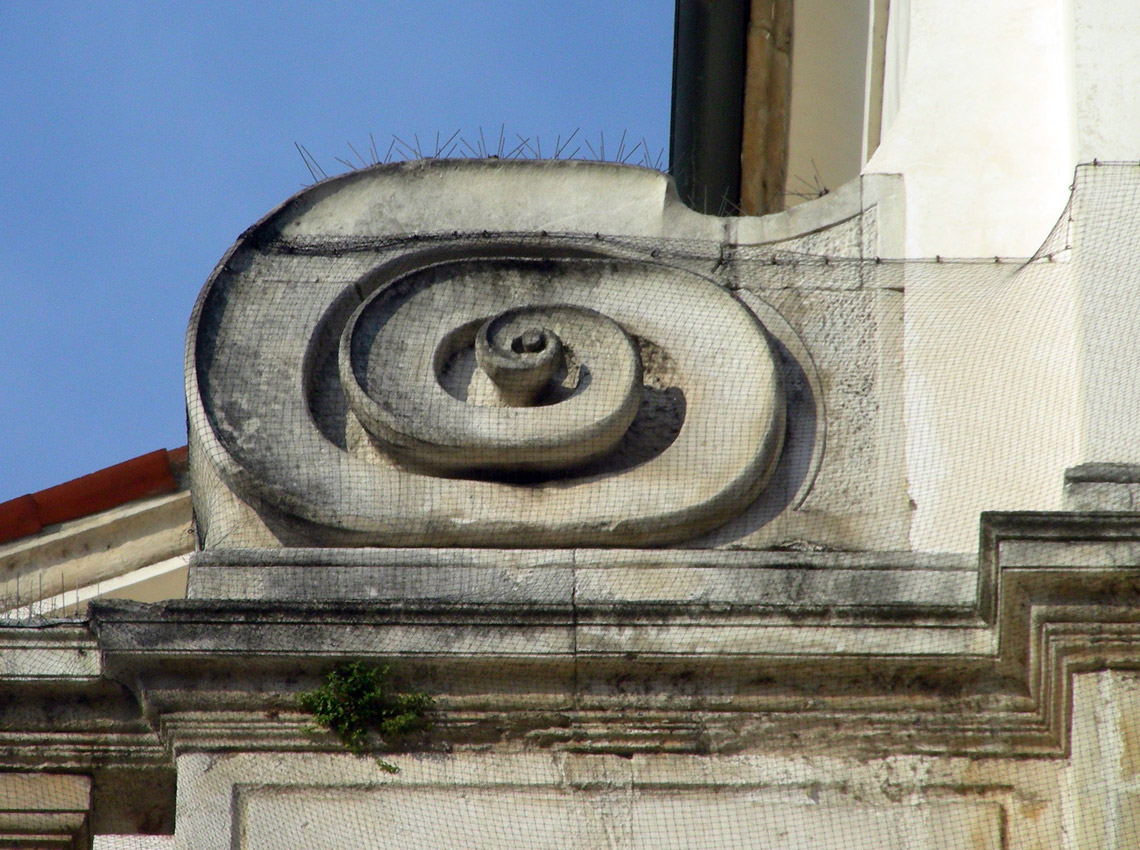
Detail of the facade

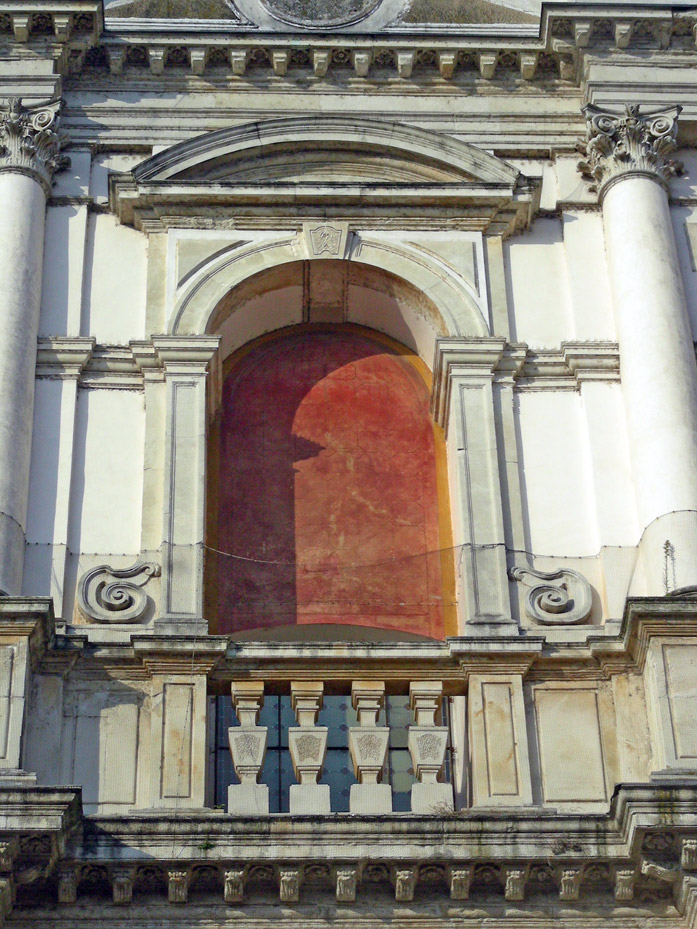
Detail of the central window in the facade

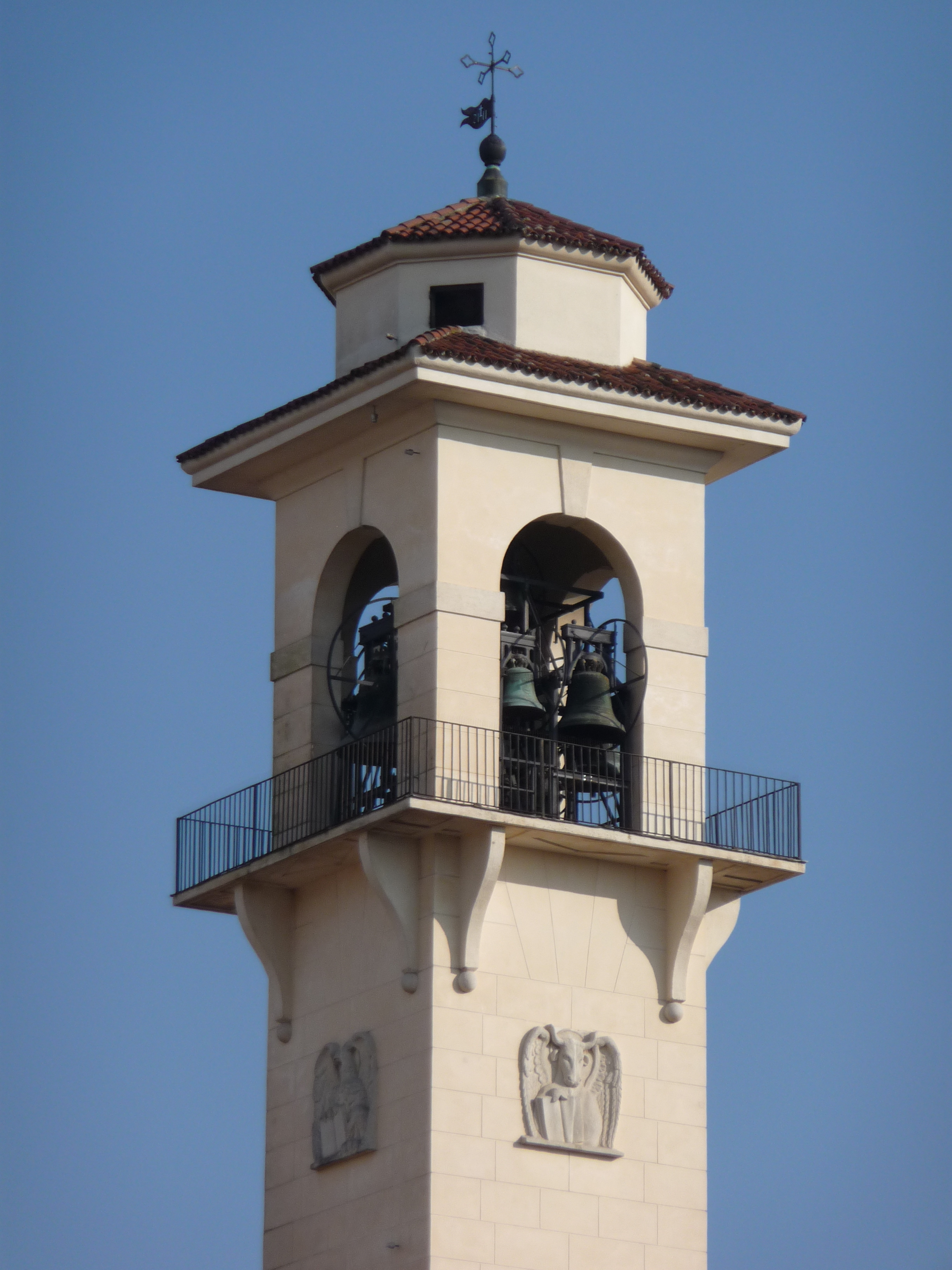
The top of the bell tower

=== Interior ===
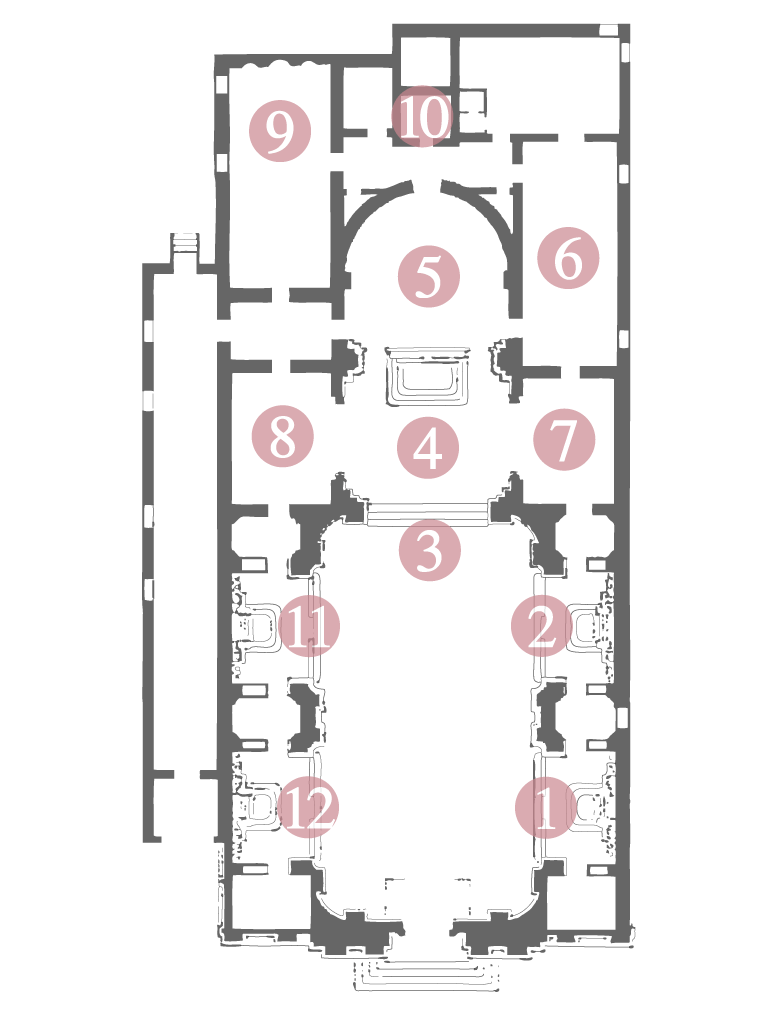
Plan of the church of San Marco in San Girolamo: 1 - First chapel on the right 2 - Second chapel on the right 3 - Arch between the nave and the presbytery 4 - Chancel 5 - Chorus 6 - Sacristy 7 - Chapel to the right of the chancel 8 - Chapel to the left of the chancel 9 - Winter chapel 10 - Belfry 11 - Second chapel on the left 12 - First chapel on the left

The interior has a main hall with a single nave and tall side chapels that provide light to the main hall through large windows.

The nave is 28 meters (85 feet) long and 11.5 m (35 ft) wide (21 m or 64 ft, including the chapels). The chancel is 18 m (55 ft) long including the semicircular apse. The nave ceiling consists of two bays. The rhythm is punctuated by a single order of Corinthian pilasters upon high pedestals of stone. On the sides of the apse there are four chapels, and at the side of the chancel there are two more chapels - now with no altar - forming the transept. Inside the blind spaces between the chapels, now used for confessionals, there were some small oratories. The 24 gravestones on the floor date back between 1720 and 1800.

==== First chapel on the right (1) ====
It is dedicated to Saint John of the Cross, co-founder of the Order of Discalced Carmelites. The altar is made in white Carrara marble. Rising above, Corinthian columns in African gray-violet breach support an arched, broken pediment, topped by a high attic with triangular pediment in the center of which shines a golden cross flanked by two flaming pots. It is an important work of the early 18th century Venetian style. The altarpiece (1735-50) is a masterwork of the Vicenzan painter Costantino Pasqualotto (il "Costantini") and depicts The vision of St. John of the Cross. The saint is depicted kneeling before a crucifix, while Christ, carrying the cross on his shoulders, appears in the clouds with a procession of angels. To the right of the chapel is opened the baptistery, built in 1909 within an existing room, with the stone baptismal font and a bas-relief of Saint John the Baptist.

==== Second chapel on the right (2) ====
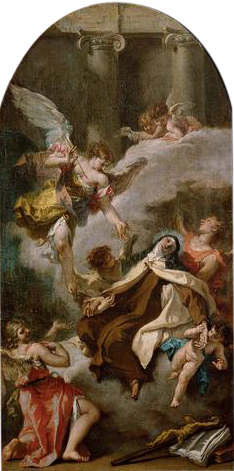
Sebastiano Ricci, The Ecstasy of Saint Teresa (1724)

It is dedicated to Saint Teresa of Ávila, the Spanish mystic that inspirated and founded the Discalced Carmelites. This altar is also made of white Carrara marble with four Corinthian columns supporting an arched pediment, on which are perched two angels. Bases and capitals are made of bronze, gilt bronze friezes are in the frontal and on the pedestals. The altarpiece (1724) depicts The Ecstasy of Saint Teresa, a masterpiece by Sebastiano Ricci, that communicates an intense emotion and the sense of a mystical sight. The saint, portrayed in a temple with Ionic columns, has fainted and supported by an angel dressed in red, while another in front of her is wielding the burning arrow of the Divine Love. Two angels hold the arms of the saint, while another, smiling, points out to the faithful.

==== On both sides of the arch between the nave and the presbytery (3) ====
Two paintings, in opulent frames of the early 18th century, depict two figures of Biblical prophets anachronistically dressed in Carmelite robes: the prophet Elisha (on the right pillar) and the prophet Elijah (left), with an angel indicating water and bread. Both were painted by the late 17th-century Veronese painter Matteo Brida.

==== Presbytery (chancel) (4) ====
The main altar (1757) is dedicated to Saint Jerome. It is made of Carrara marble with gilded bronze friezes. At the center of the frontal plaque there is the saint beating his chest. On either side, two plates represent Saint Teresa (at left) and Saint John of the Cross (at right). The door of the tabernacle is in embossed silver, gilded and engraved. On the sides, the two pairs of marble angels above the doors of the choir are by Giacomo Cassetti (1703-1760). Lacquered and gilt wooden sculptures of great value, belonging to the ancient furniture of the church (18th century), were adjusted to make the two ambos, the altar facing the people and the celebrant chair.

==== Chorus (5) ====
Behind the altar stands the ancient chorus with the wooden stalls of the monks (restored in 2010). An inscription on the floor with the arms of the Carmelite testifies the presence of a crypt below (no longer accessible) where the mortal remains of the Fathers lie. The impressive organ above the choir was built in 1900 by the firm Pugina and inserted into a solemn wooden structure designed by architect Vittorio Barichella. On the coping of the organ there is a statue of Christ the Redeemer, by the sculptor Belcaro, flanked by Saint Mark (left) and Saint Jerome (right). The organ was restored in 2009, and is appreciated for concerts.

==== Sacristy (6) ====
The complete, original set of altar and wardrobes is of considerable value. It was made in walnut inlay and carving work in the early 18th century and it was completely restored in 1988–89. It hosts 157 doors and 93 drawers. In the back wall is the altar with two columns and broken pediment flanked by two cabinets with curved pediment. Between the two columns is displayed a painting by Bartolomeo Letterini (1669-1745) depicting the Virgin Mary, Baby Jesus, St. Teresa, St. Joseph, St. Joachim and St. Anne. In front of the blade is placed a crucifix in boxwood. The side walls host two large cabinets, each comprising three major bodies joined together by two lower bodies divided by pilasters. The central parts are decorated with two paintings of the same Letterini: the one on the right depicts Saint John of the Cross, the left Saint Joseph with the Child Jesus.

==== Chapel to the right of the chancel (7) ====
On the bottom wall is a masterpiece painted by Giovanni Antonio De Pieri called "Lo Zoppo" (the cripple) from Vicenza depicting Saint Jerome in Glory (1727), while he contemplates the crucifix and is taken up into heaven by angels. It was originally located in a central position in the apse.

==== Chapel to the left of the chancel (8) ====
On the back wall are exhibited two works of the 17th century by the family Maganza, formerly belonging to the ancient church of St. Jerome of the Jesuati. The left one is the work of Giovanni Battista Maganza the Younger and it portrays The deposed Christ with Mary and Mary Magdalene, St. John the Evangelist and St. Nicholas the Bishop (1615). The right one is by Alessandro Maganza and depicts the Holy Trinity with Blessed John Colombini and St. Charles Borromeo (1612).

==== Winter chapel (9) ====
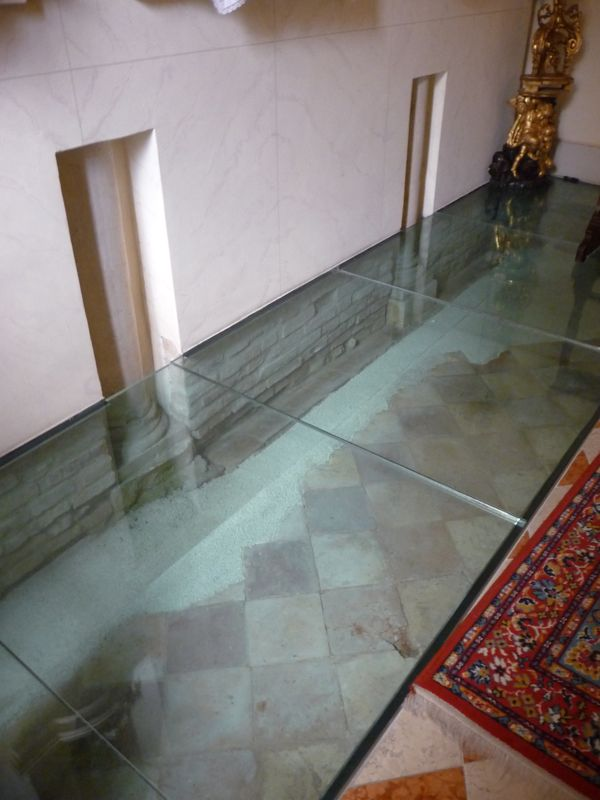
Winter chapel: detail of the original floor and the little columns of the cloister.

Recently restored and dedicated to the Merciful Jesus and Saint Jerome, the chapel retains a rare painting by Giovanni Battista Maganza the Elder (1513-1586) called the "Magagnò", depicting Saint Jerome penitent (before 1570), the first known dated work of the artist. The back wall of the chapel has three shallow niches, found during the restoration, that host three present icons depicting Christ, Saint Mark and Saint Mary. On the bottom you can see some traces of the ancient convent of the Jesuati: the columns of the cloister, then incorporated into the wall with the expansion of the church by the Carmelites, and a large section of the original floor.

==== Belfry (10) ====
Located behind the apse, perfectly aligned with the plan of the church, the belfry was accessible through the door in the middle of the chorus that put in direct communication the church and the convent. Inside the belfry there is a fresco with the monogram of Christ "JHS", dating back to the old convent of the Jesuati; other frescoes may be seen climbing the stairs that lead to the bells, a few feet of the base, to the door leading to organ and accessing small rooms that were used by the monks.

==== Second chapel on the left (11) ====
The altar is dedicated to Our Lady of Mount Carmel. Four columns in elegant French red marble support a pediment surmounted by a pediment lively. At the center of the gable is placed a garland of golden metal with two palms. Frontal, and balustrade pedestals are inlaid with red marble. The altarpiece by Antonio Balestra depicts Vision of the Virgin handing the scapular to the Blessed Simon Stock in the presence of Saint Joseph (circa 1730). Simon Stock, first general prior of the Carmelites, is the patron saint of the Order. At the bottom center is depicted Saint Joseph, which an angel holding a lily. On the sides are hung two paintings by the late 18th century and early 19th century: the one on the right depicts Saint Patrick, the one on the left Saint John the Confessor; they both come from the destroyed church of St. Bartholomew (San Bortolo), like the other five paintings in octagon frames exposed in the other chapels.

==== First chapel on the left (12) ====
The altar of the chapel of Saint Anne is made in Carrara marble and behind rise Corinthian columns of gray-violet African breach, holding a curved pediment surmounted by two statues with a coat of arms in the center. The altarpiece depicts The Education of the Virgin Mary with Anne, Joachim and the child Mary, with Saint Joachim in the act of instructing the girl Mary about the prophecy of Isaiah: "Ecce virgo concipiet" ("a virgin shall conceive"). According to some scholars, the work is attributed to either Lodovico Buffetti (1722-1782) pr Gaetano Scabri (1741-1820).

== Artworks ==
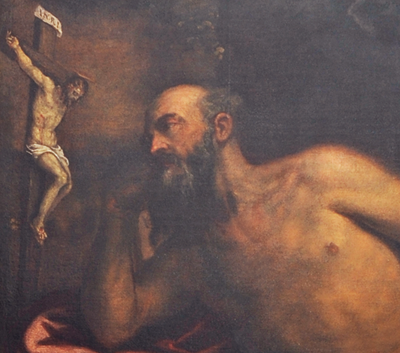
Giovanni Battista Maganza the Elder (called Magagnò), St. Jerome penitent (1570), detail.

Some of the main artworks preserved in the church:

- Costantino Pasqualotto: The Vision of St. John of the Cross, between 1735 and 1750, altarpiece of the first chapel on the right.
- Sebastiano Ricci: Ecstasy of St. Teresa of Avila, ca. 1725, altarpiece of the second chapel on the right.
- Lodovico Buffetti (attributed): Education of the Blessed Virgin, with Anna and Joachim, altarpiece of the first chapel on the left.
- Antonio Balestra: Vision of the Blessed Virgin giving the scapular to the Blessed Simon Stock at the presence of Saint Joseph, between 1725 and early thirties, altarpiece of the second chapel on the left.
- Giovanni Antonio De Pieri: St. Jerome hold to Heaven by Angels, 1727, right side of transept (once placed in the apse).
- Matteo Brida: The Prophet Elijah and The prophet Elisha, first half of the 18th century, concave wall at both sides of the main arch.
- Giovanni Battista Maganza the Younger: Dead Christ with Mary and Mary Magdalene, John the Evangelist and Saint Nicholas Bishop, 1615, in the left transept (once in the Jesuati Church).
- Alessandro Maganza: The Trinity with the Blessed Giovanni Colombini and San Carlo Borromeo, 1612, left transept (once in the Jesuati Church).
- Giovanni Battista Maganza the Elder: St. Jerome penitent, 1570, Winter Chapel of The Divine Mercy and St. Jerome (once in the Jesuati Church).

== Bibliography ==
=== Sources ===
- Edoardo Arslan, Catalogo delle cose d'arte e di antichità d'Italia – Vicenza, vol. I – le chiese, De Luca, Roma 1961. pp. 105–110
- Giovanna Dalla Pozza Peruffo, Tarcisio Pirocca, Chiesa di S. Marco in S. Girolamo - Bicentenario, Vicenza 2010
- Giuseppe Scapin, Brevi notizie storiche della parrocchia di S. Marco in S. Girolamo, Vicenza, Scuola grafica Istituto S. Gaetano, 25 luglio 1969
- Parrocchia di S. Marco in S. Girolamo, last visited 2010-12-28

Note: the article is a translation from it.wiki, revision of 29 october 2013.

=== Further reading ===
- Francesco Fontana, Il Sei e Settecento a Vicenza, in Vicenza, aspetti di una città attraverso i secoli, Tip. Rumor, Vicenza, 1983
- Giovanni Mantese, Memorie storiche della chiesa vicentina, vol. III parte II, Neri Pozza, Vicenza, pp. 394–397
- Giovanni Mantese, Memorie storiche della chiesa vicentina, vol. IV parte I, Accademia Olimpica, Vicenza, pp. 377–383
