= Corbellini =

Corbellini is a name of Italian origin which may refer to:

== People ==
- Antonio Corbellini, Italian architect
- Carlo Corbellini, 18th-century Italian architect
- Domenico Corbellini, Italian architect
- Giacomo Antonio Corbellini (1674—1742), Italian Baroque stuccoist
- Gilberto Corbellini (born 1958), Italian philosopher
- Giorgio Corbellini (1947–2019), Italian bishop
- Guido Corbellini (1890–1976), Italian engineer and politician
- Helena Corbellini (born 1959), Uruguayan writer and academic
- Isabella Corbellini (born 1972), Italian athlete
- Luigi Corbellini (1901–1968), Italian painter
- Vanni Corbellini (born 1955), Italian actor
- Vital Corbellini (born 1959), Brazilian bishop
