= Duomo of Thiene =

Roman Catholic church in Italy

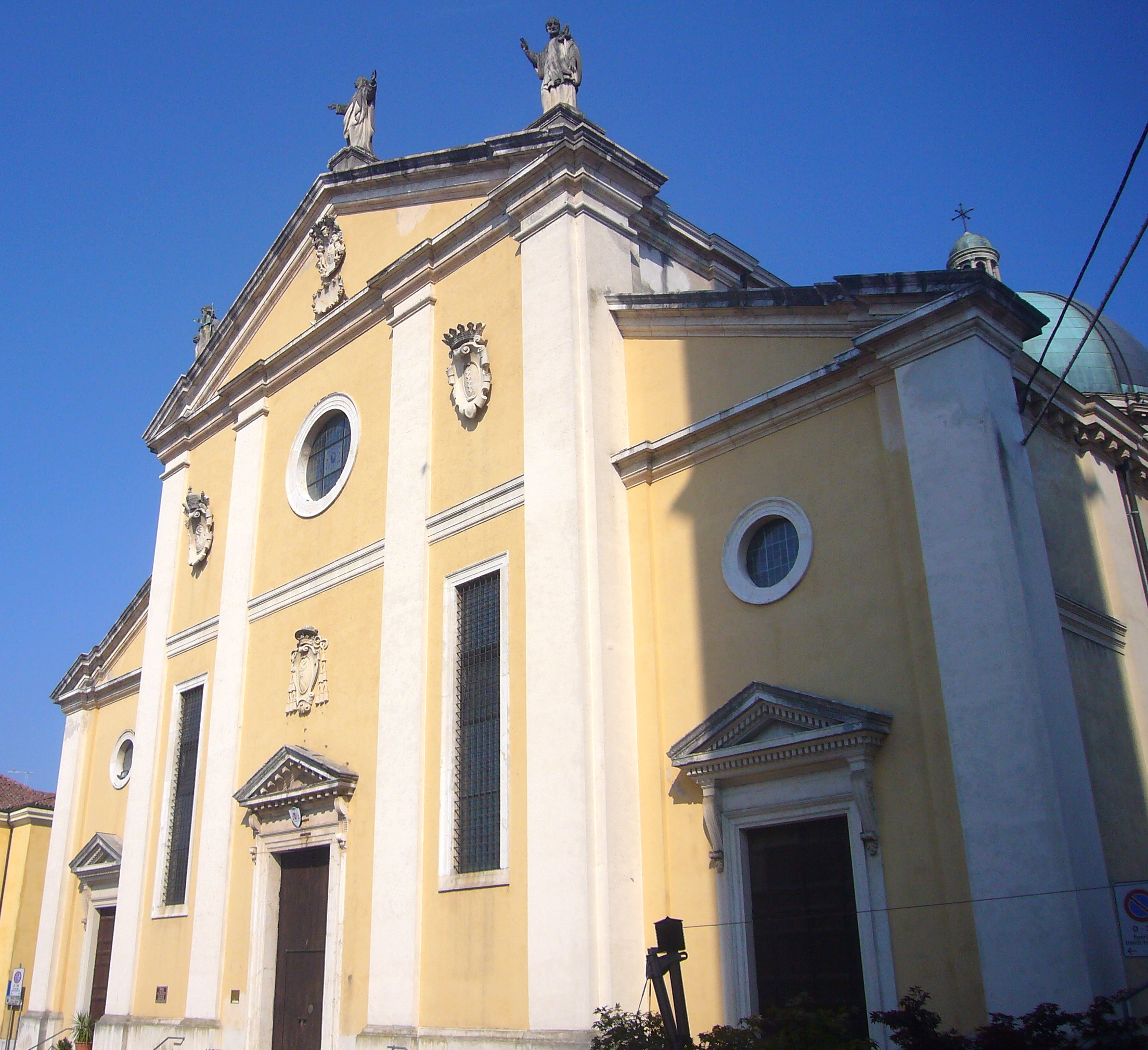
- The facade of the church

Religion
- Affiliation: Roman Catholic
- Province: Vicenza

Location
- Location: Thiene, Italy
- Interactive map of Duomo of Thiene
- Coordinates: 45.7058°N 11.4779°E

Architecture
- Type: Duomo
- Style: Baroque
- Groundbreaking: 1625

The Duomo of Thiene (Italian: Duomo di Thiene) is a Roman Catholic church in Thiene, in the province of Vicenza, Italy, dedicated to Saint Cajetan (San Gaetano di Thiene) and the Assumption of the Blessed Virgin Mary.

== History and description ==
The present building replaced a previous church of the Assumption which apparently dated from before 1166. Construction was completed by 1314. It was rebuilt in 1625, and was substantially altered in the late 18th century by architect Ottone Calderari. The dome was not added till the 1930s. The nave ceiling is decorated with 15 paintings by Baroque Venetian painters, including Giulio Carpioni and Giovanni Battista Pittoni.

Next to the church is the tall obelisk-like bell tower, designed by Sebastiano Serlio, beyond which is the Church of the Rosary built in 1685 in a staid Baroque style. This church contains stucco and painted decorations by the local artists Ballante (1657-1729) and Valentino Bassi (17th century). The main altarpiece was painted in 1590 by Matteo Grazioli. The painting of the Annunciation in the north aisle was painted by the school of Alessandro Maganza (1509-1589). There are some ancient frescos, restored in the 1700s, of the "Madonna delle Grazie" and a marble statue of Saint Joseph by Orazio Marinali.

== Sources ==
- Thiene municipal website (in Italian)
