= Masters M45 3000 metres world record progression =

This is the progression of world record improvements of the 3000 metres M45 division of Masters athletics. Records must be set in properly conducted, official competitions under the standing IAAF rules unless modified by World Masters Athletics. The M45 division consists of male athletes who have reached the age of 45 but have not yet reached the age of 50, so exactly from their 45th birthday to the day before their 50th birthday.

Key

Incomplete information Pending

Hand	Auto	Athlete	Nationality	Birthdate	Location	Date
8:27.7		Nigel Gates	United Kingdom	18 May 1953	Brighton	19 August 1998
	8:36.82	Vittorio Fontanella	Italy	17 March 1953	Piovene Rocchette	10 May 1998
