= San Lorenzo, Verona =

Church building in Verona, Italy

Coordinates: 45°26′28″N 10°59′28″E

San Lorenzo is a Romanesque style, Roman Catholic church on Corso Cavour in central Verona, region of Veneto, Italy.

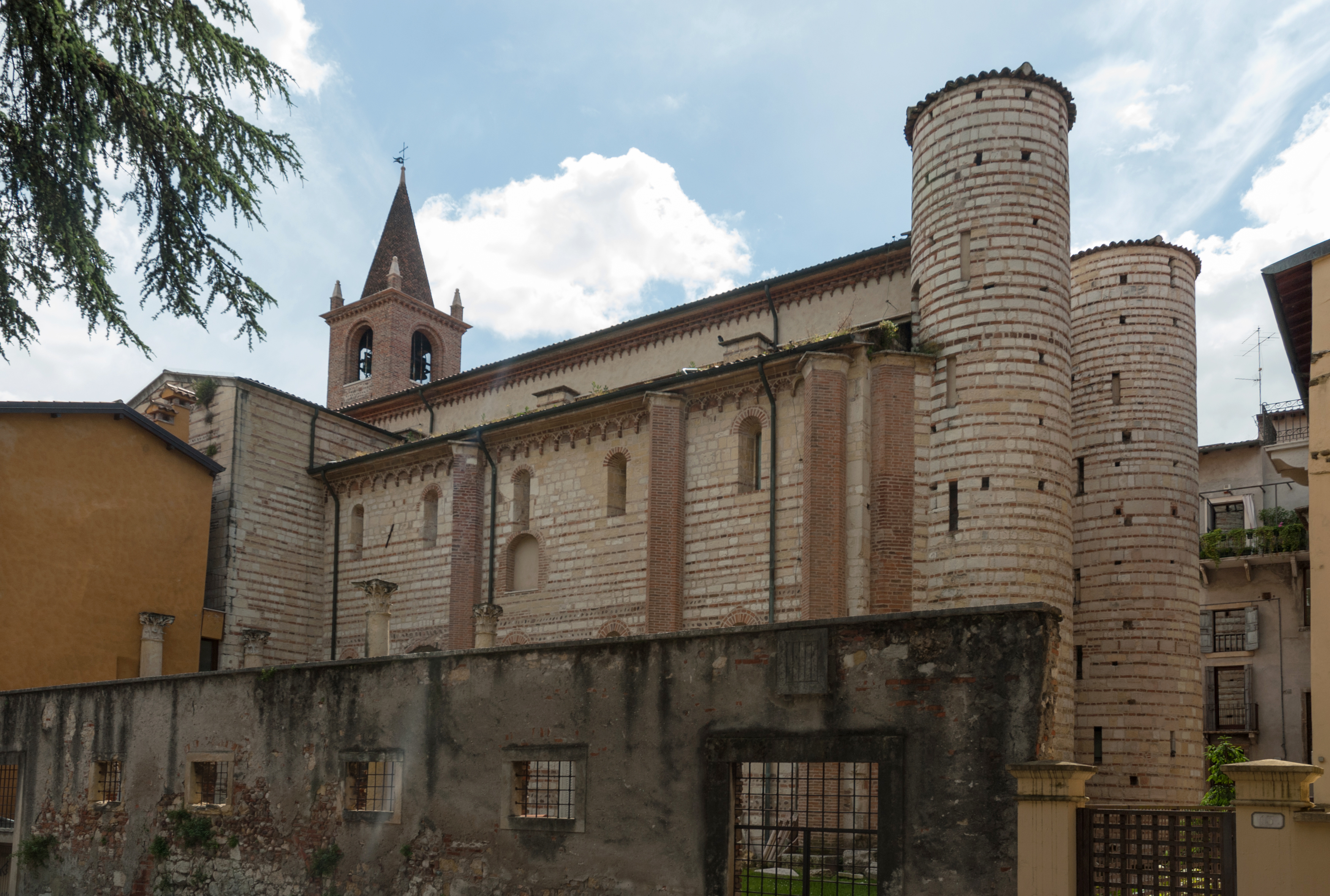
San Lorenzo side view with facade towers and belltower

== History ==
A church at this site was present since the 4th century. The present church was initially rebuilt in the 12th century after the devastation of the 1117 earthquake. It underwent a number of restorations including one in 1877 and after World War II. The construction alternates brick and stone. This gives the interior a striking pattern of stripes in the structural columns as well as in much of the walls and apse.

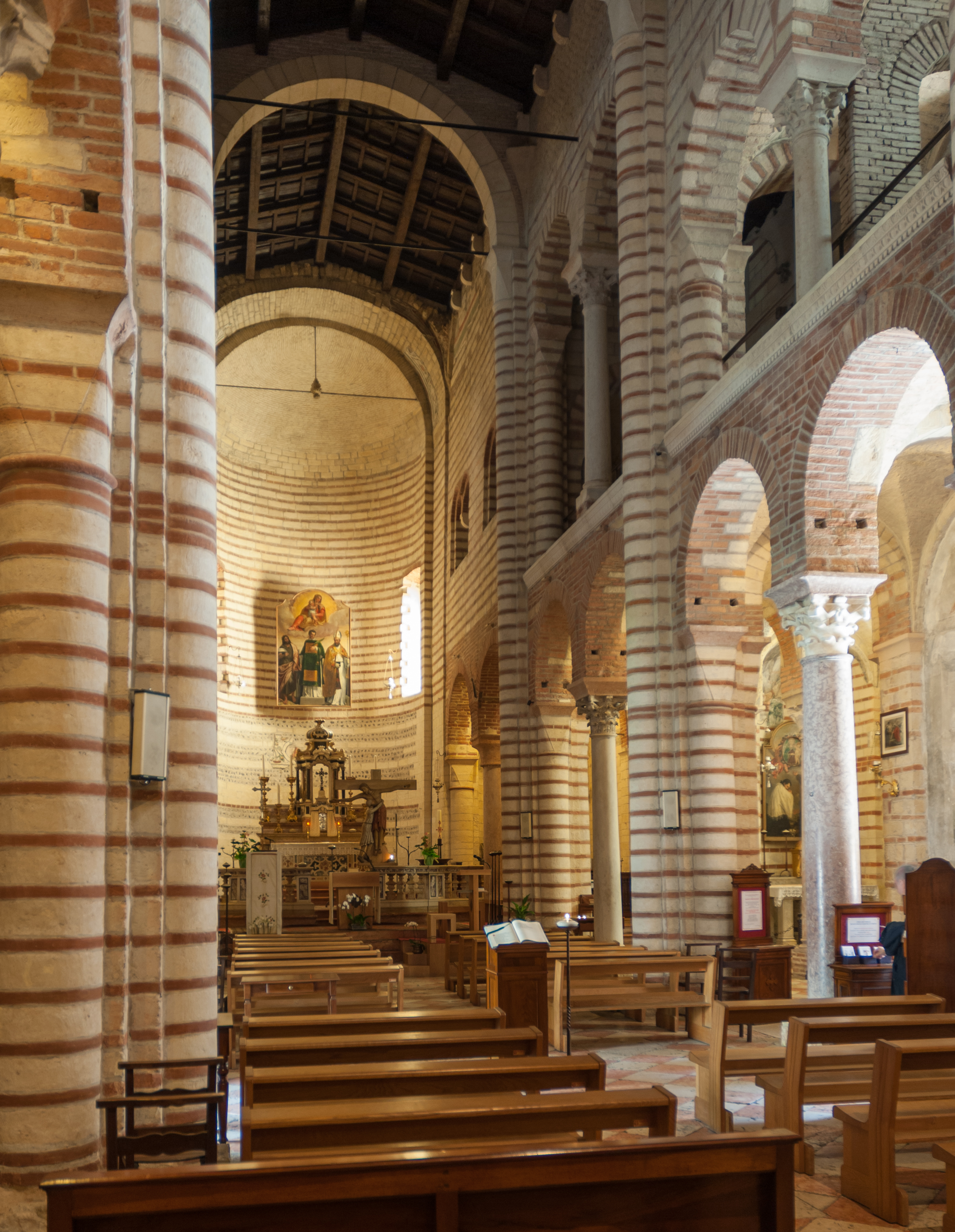
Interior towards apse.

The bell-tower was added in 1468 and contains a peal of five bells in Bb, cast in 1830 and still ringable in Veronese bellringing art. The facade is unusual given the two towers sheltering cylindrical staircases that lead up to the upper gallery alongside the central nave. Putatively the upper gallery of matroneo was used by the women attending service.

The main altarpiece depicts a Madonna and child with Saints by Domenico Brusasorci (1566). The church also contains fresco fragments from the 13th to 14th centuries, and in the chapel of the left nave, a David by Nicolò Giolfino.

An inventory from 1750, noted the left of the altar was a copy of Raphael's Virgin and Child with Saints John the Baptist, Joseph, and Anne. The church also had paintings by Alessandro Turchi (L'Orbetto) and Matteo Brida.
