= Pasqualotto =

Pasqualotto is a surname. Notable people with the surname include:

- Costantino Pasqualotto (1681–1755), Italian painter
- Gino Pasqualotto (1955–2019), Italian ice hockey player
- Mónica Pasqualotto (born 1974), TV host, radio host, actress, and model
