= Giovanni Battista Maganza =

Italian painter (c. 1513 – 1586)

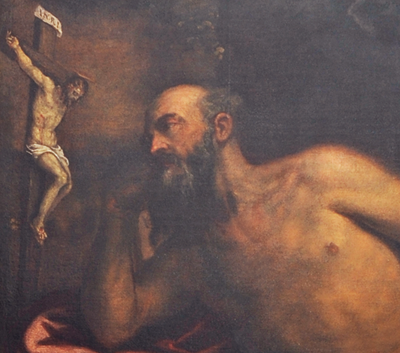
- Giovanni Battista Maganza, Saint Jerome penitent (1570), detail. San Marco in San Girolamo, Vicenza.
- Born: c. 1513; Calaone near Vicenza
- Died: August 25, 1586 (aged 72–73)
- Other name: Magagnò (pseudonym)
- Occupations: Artist; poet

Giovanni Battista Maganza (c. 1513 – August 25, 1586) was a late Italian Renaissance painter and poet from Vicenza in the area of Calaone, mainly producing religious altarpieces for local churches.

== Biography ==
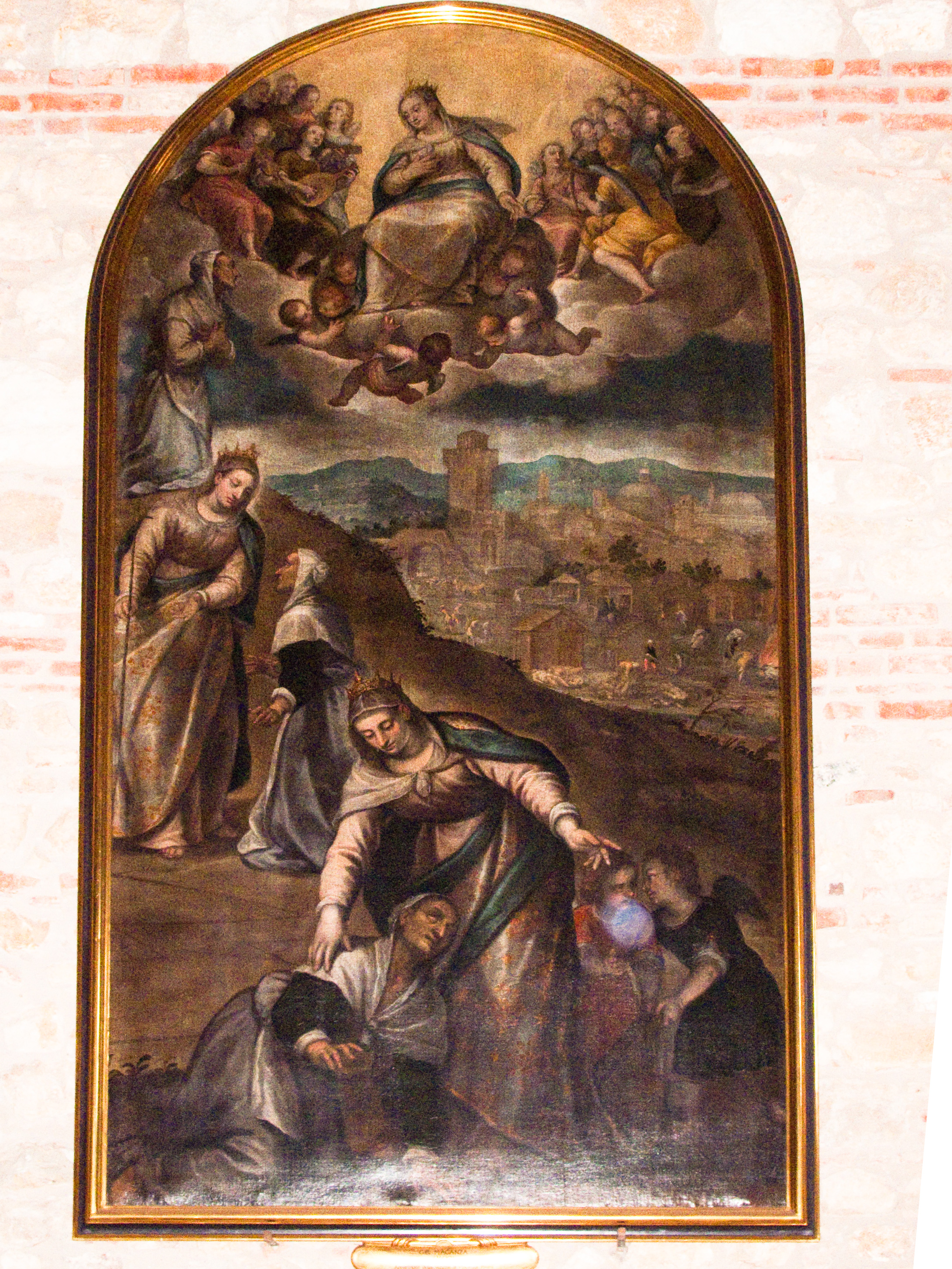
Altarpiece for church of San Giorgio, Vicenza

Maganza was a friend of architect Andrea Palladio. He visited Rome between 1546 and 1547 and also met Gian Giorgio Trissino and the poet Marco Thiene. Maganza was also member of the Accademia Olimpica (Olympic Academy) in Venice, where he designed costumes for the play Oedipus Rex, the first opera presented at the Palladio-designed Teatro Olimpico.

As a poet, he wrote satires in the Paduan dialect (more precisely in a now-dead form of it, called "dialetto pavano"), under the nickname Magagnò.

Maganza's son Alessandro Maganza was also a prominent local painter. Fontana cites Lanzi and Zanetti as Maganza's dates of birth and death as 1509 and 1589 Giovanni De Mio was one of his pupils.

== Works ==
Partial listing:

- San Girolamo penitente (Saint Jerome Penitent) (1570), San Marco in San Girolamo church, Vicenza
- Pala del Rosario (1583), Montebello Vicentino church.
- La conversione di S.Paolo (Conversion of Saint Paul) (16th century), at the large altar of the Novale di Valdagno church, Vicenza.
- Frescoes in Villa Repeta and Campiglia dei Berici.

== See also ==
- San Marco in San Girolamo

== Bibliography ==
- Freedberg, Sydney J. (1993). Pelican History of Art (ed.). Painting in Italy, 1500-1600. Penguin Books. p. 565.
