= Santa Maria del Summano =

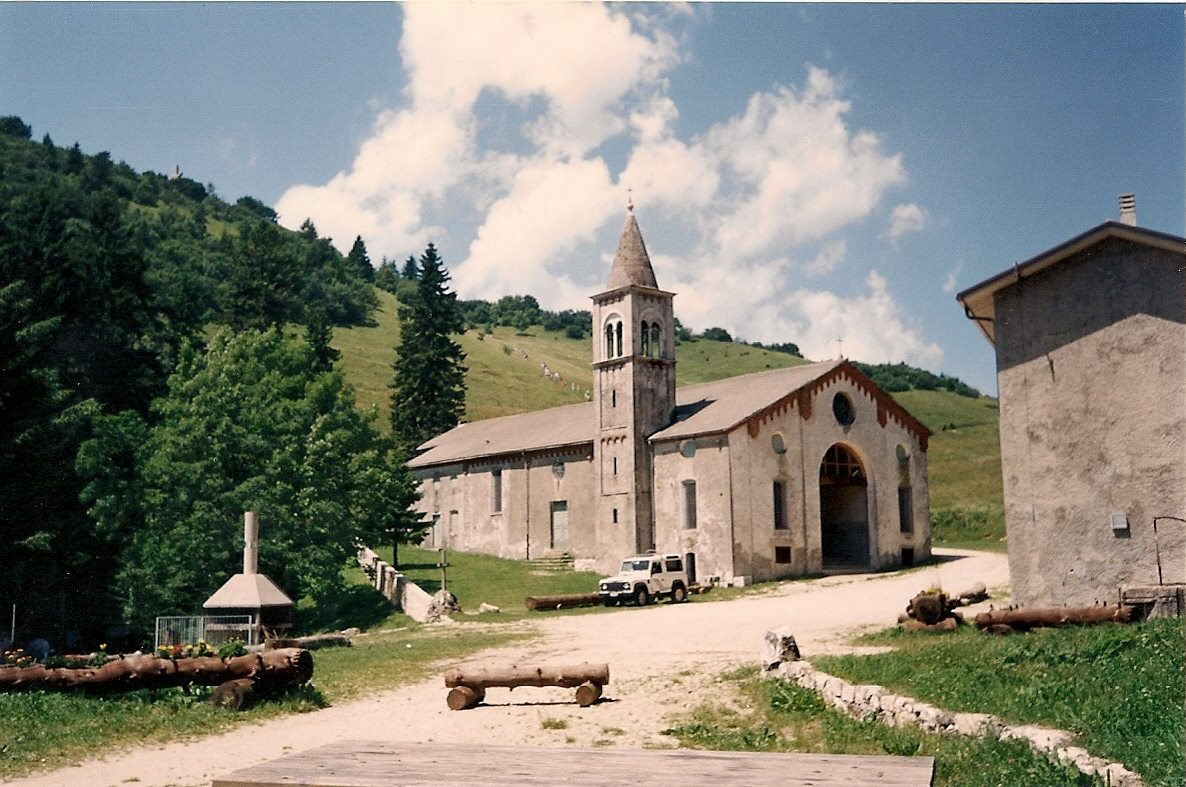

Santa Maria del Summano is a pilgrimage church associated with Monte Summano in the province of Vicenza, region of Veneto, Italy. The church is referred to by various names: Santuario della Beata Vergine dell'Angelo di Piovene or Santuario Santa Maria del Summano.

== History ==
The church was established around a venerated icon of the Madonna di San Prosdocimo, later renamed the Madonna del Monte Summano. According to an older tradition, in the first century AD, specifically the year 77, the then bishop of Padua, San Prosdocimo, climbed to the peak of this mountain to destroy the pagan idol statue dedicated to Plutone (Summus Manium). Later St Orso was said to have made a pilgrimage to this site, leading to the construction of a sanctuary chapel and a monastery. The present Madonna statue is said to date to the second half of the 15th century.

Circa 1300 the sanctuary was linked to the order of Canons Regular of San Marco di Mantua. In 1452, the church and convent were granted to Hieronymites from the congregation of the blessed Pietro Gambacorta da Pisa. The church was reconstructed with a nave and two aisles, and reconsecrated on 30 May 1516. With the suppression by the Venetian republic of many monasteries in 1777, the venerated Madonna statue was moved to the parish church in Santorso. The church fell to ruins. In the years 1893–1896, the church was rebuilt at the same site, same style, under the patronage of the Italian senator Alessandro Rossi using a design of Ottone Calderari.. A new image, of Maria Ausiliatrice, was sculpted by Pietro Dalla Vecchia of Santorso. In 1894, the hieronymite order returned to the monastery until 1933. The church now belongs to the parish of Santorso.
