= Antonio Elenetti =

Italian painter

Antonio Elenetti (died 14 June 1767) was an Italian painter of the late-Baroque period, active in Verona. He trained with Simone Brentana in Verona. He painted an altarpiece of St. Anthony of Padua for the church of Ogni Santi in Verona.

== Sources ==
- Zannandreis, Diego (1891). Giuseppe Biadego (ed.). Le vite dei pittori, scultori e architetti veronesi. Verona: Stabilimento Tipo-Litografico G. Franchini. p. 367. "zannandreis."
