= Filippo Maccari =

Italian painter

Filippo Maccari (Bologna, 1705- 22 October 1800) was an Italian painter and scenic designer, mainly painting quadratura.

== Biography ==
He trained in Bologna under Giovanni Carlo Galli-Bibbiena, but moved to Verona to work with Carlo's brother, Antonio Galli Bibiena, in 1764, where he was employed, along with Lorenzo Pavia, in the decoration and scenography of the Teatro Filarmonico. Maccari was also engaged to paint a palazzi in Salò and Brescia. In Verona, he was elected to the Accademia Filarmonica as a scenic designer. Among his pupils were Giovanni Canella, Carlo Ederle (painter), Francesco Marcola, and Giovanni Battista Gru.

He painted the quadratura for a room in the Casa Ferrari in the San Silvestro, while Francesco Lorenzi painted the figures, including a chiaroscuro bust of Maccari himself. Francesco Marcola was one of his pupils.
