= Michelangelo Spada =

Italian painter

Michelangelo Spada (fl. 1730) was an Italian painter in Verona. He should not be confused with the 16th century Count Michelangelo Spada of Terni who was chamberlain of Pope Julius III.

== Biography ==
The son of Marcantonio Spada, a merchant, he trained initially under Simone Brentana (1656 – 1742), then traveled to Bologna to work under Giovanni Giuseppe dal Sole. In Bologna, he painted for the palace of the count Ercole Giusti. He painted two canvases, now lost, depicting David playing Harp with Angels and Angels playing music. Another lost painting was the main altarpiece for the church of the Filippini in Verona, depicting the Assumption of the Virgin with the Holy Trinity, and San Phillip Neri. He also painted for the church of Santa Caterina della Ruota, including one depicting events of the Apocalypse by St John: the Woman of Babylon on the seven headed beast; but also the Fall of Lucifer, an Immaculate Conception; and a God the father. He painted lunette frescoes (now lost) in the Convent of Sant'Anastasia ( which became the Lyceum), with scenes from the life of St Dominic and St Peter Martyr. Michelangelo Spada's sister, Veronica, was a painter of still-life.
