= Grazio Cossali =

Italian painter

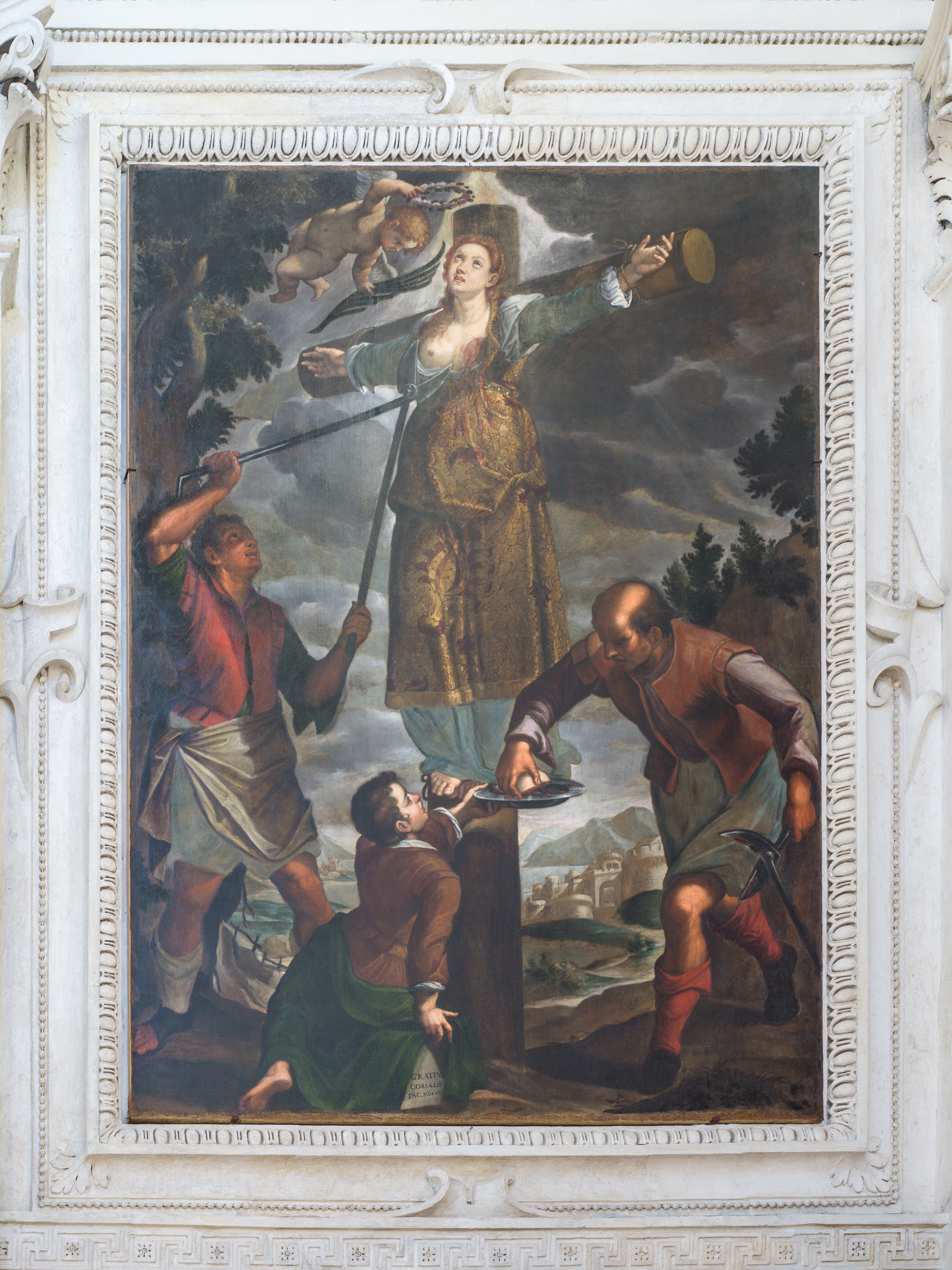
Martyrdom of Saint Agatha by Grazio Cossali in the Chiesa di San Gaetano church in Brescia.

Grazio Cossali, sometimes called Orazio Cossali (1563 – December 4, 1629) was an Italian painter who worked in Brescia, Cremona, and Venice, active during the Mannerist or early Baroque periods.

== Biography ==
Born in Orzinuovi, Province of Brescia, he is sometimes referred to as Cossale. He is said to paint in the style of Palma il Giovane.

In the Brescian churches of Santa Maria delle Grazie and Santa Maria dei Miracoli are paintings of the Adoration of the Magi and the Presentation of Mary in the Temple. He also painted for the churches of San Lorenzo and San Francesco in Brescia. He painted a small Coronation of the Virgin (1590s) for the parish church of Quinzanello. He painted a canvas on the history of Carlo Borromeo for the church of the Madonna della Stella in Cellatica.

The town hall, or Palazzo Communale, of Cremona has one of his paintings, one depicting the Harvest of the Manna (1587) in the Council Chamber (or hall of the Paintings). His son Giacomo was also a painter.
