= Giovanni Antonio De Pieri =

Italian painter

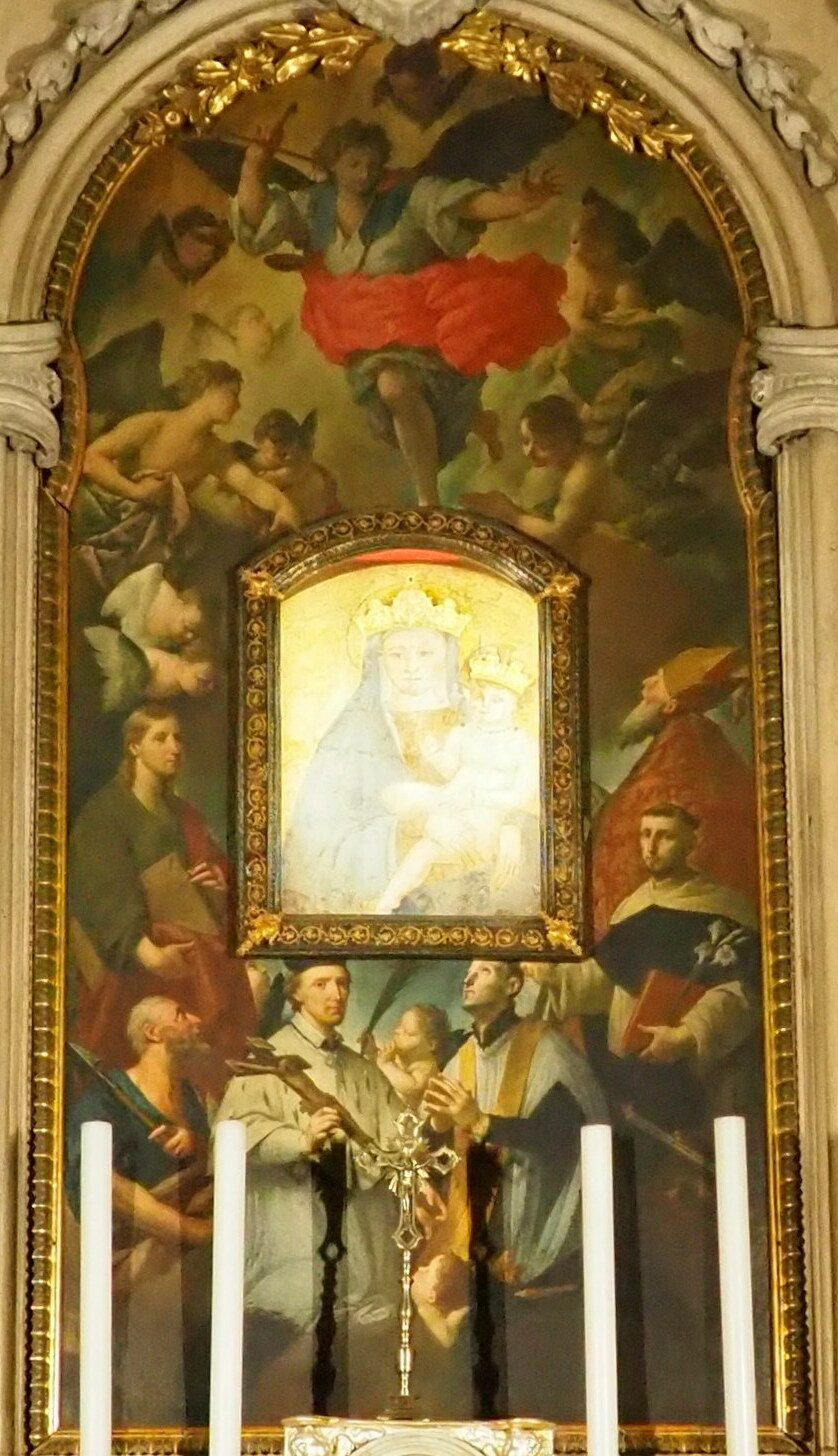
The painting, by de Pieri, surrounding the 15th-century image of Our Lady of Grace in the altar of the same name in Rovigo Cathedral.

Giovanni Antonio De Pieri, known as il Zoppo Vicentino (1671–1751) was an Italian painter of the Baroque style, born and active in Vicenza, Republic of Venice.

He was prolific locally in painting sacred subjects. He was dismissed by the art historian Lanzi as having an easy brush but less decisive. An inventory of art in Vicenza in 1769, cites the following works by Pieri:

- God the Father and Saints, Education of the Virgin, Flight to Egypt, and Madonna and Child at San Bartolomeo
- Judith decapitates Holofernes at Santa Maria in Araceli
- Canon Lateran Priest and Soldier at Corpus Domine church of Canons Lateran
- St Antony and Child for parish church of Santa Croce
- St Benedict for church of Santa Caterina
- Arrival of the Holy Spine on organ shutters, an oval depicting Santa Rosa, and Ascent of Christ for a chapel in the church of Santa Corona
- Deposition for parish church of San Marcello
- Saints Benedict and Scholastica in Glory for the church of Santi Felice e Fortunato
- Apparition of Virgin to Beato Felice for the church of the Cappuccini
- Martyrdom of San Apollonio for the church of La Misericordia
- Virgin grants the Rosary to St Dominic with St Catherine of Siena for San Domenico
- San Girolamo and Angels for San Marco in San Girolamo
