= San Lorenzo, Brescia =

Church in Brescia, Italy

Coordinates: 45.5357°N 10.2198°E

San Lorenzo is a Baroque style, Roman Catholic church located on via Moretto, just north of Camera di Commercio di Brescia, and near Piazza Bruno Boni, in Brescia, region of Lombardy, Italy.

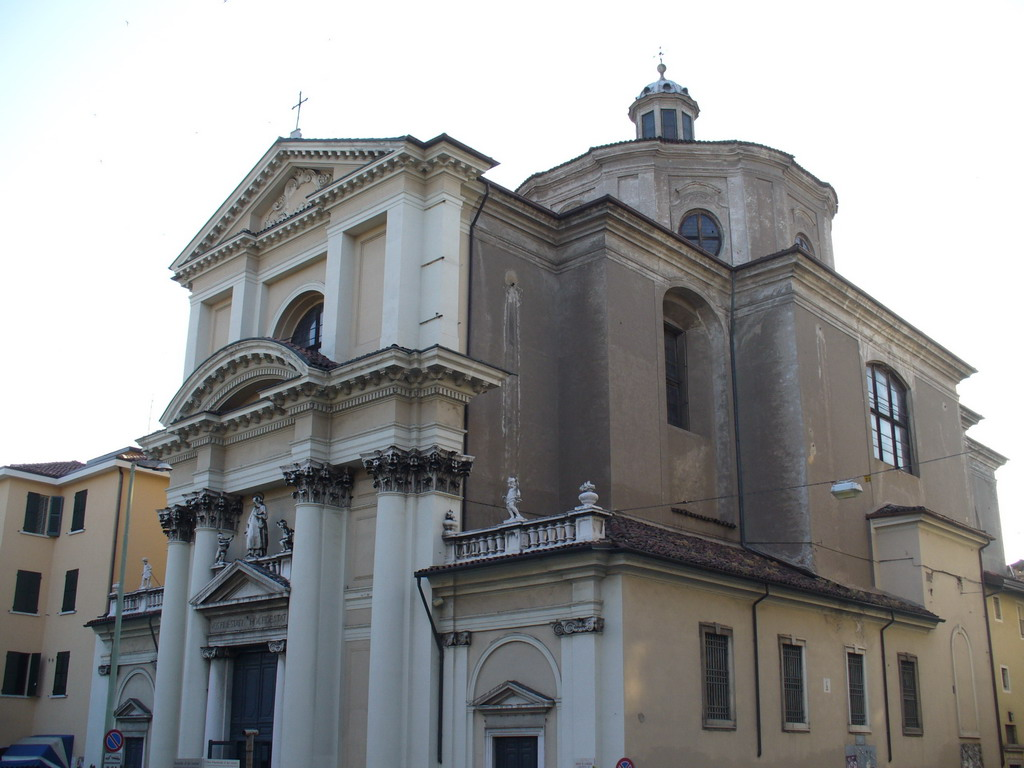
Facade and dome

== History ==
A parish church was located at the site since the 13th century, and rebuilt in 1751–1763 in the Baroque style using designs of Domenico Corbellini. The Latin cross layout is surmounted by an octagonal cupola with lantern.

Among the interior paintings are:

- Savior emerges from Calvary by Grazio Cossali
- San Biagio, 1st altar, by Lodovico Sigurtà
- Crucifixion, 2nd altar, by Il Lucchese (Pietro Ricchi?)
- Blessed Virgin and Guardian Angel, 3rd altar, by Santo Cattaneo
- Martyrdom of St Lawrence, Main altar, by Giambettino Cignaroli
- Holy family, 5th altar, by Francesco Lorenzi

The church is notable for an altar dedicated to the Madonna of Providence, with cherubs by the sculptor Antonio Callegari.
