= Simone Brentana =

Italian painter

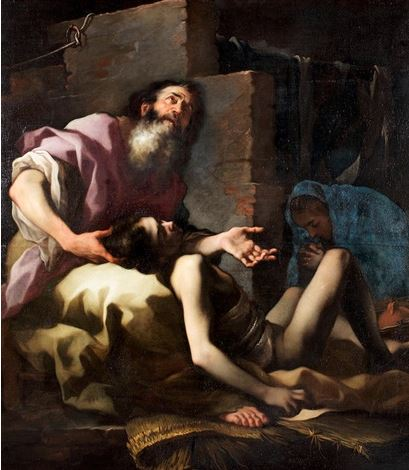
Elijah and the Widow of Zarephath

Simone Brentana (1656 – 9 June 1742) was an Italian painter of the Baroque period, active in Verona, Republic of Venice. He was born in Venice to Domenico Brentana, but became orphaned by age nine. After a prolonged desultory education in various fields including music, he trained as a painter in Venice with Pietro Negri, frequenting the Accademia di Belle Arti, moving in 1685 to Verona, where most of his paintings are located.

Among his pupils were Antonio Baroni, Michelangelo Spada, Tommaso Dossi, Antonio Elenetti, Giovanni Battista Marcola, and Lodovico Buffetti.

== Sources ==
- Zannandreis, Diego (1891). Giuseppe Biadego (ed.). Le vite dei pittori, scultori e architetti veronesi. Verona: Stabilimento Tipo-Litografico G. Franchini. pp. 300–302.
- Ticozzi, Stefano (1830). Dizionario degli architetti, scultori, pittori, intagliatori in rame ed in pietra, coniatori di medaglie, musaicisti, niellatori, intarsiatori d'ogni etá e d'ogni nazione' (Volume 1). Milan: Gaetano Schiepatti. p. 216.
