= Piovene Rocchette =

- Comune
- Comune di Piovene Rocchette
- Coat of arms

- Location within Italy Location within Veneto
- Coordinates: 45°46′N 11°26′E
- Country: Italy
- Region: Veneto
- Province: Vicenza (VI)

Government
  - Mayor: Maurizio Colman

Area
  - Total: 12 km^{2} (4.6 sq mi)
- Elevation: 277 m (909 ft)

Population (31 August 2008)
  - Total: 8,272
  - Density: 690/km^{2} (1,800/sq mi)
- Demonym: Piovenesi/Rocchettensi
- Time zone: UTC+1 (CET)
  - Summer (DST): UTC+2 (CEST)
- Postal code: 36013
- Dialing code: 0445
- Patron saint: St. Stephen
- Saint day: 26 December
- Website: Official website

Piovene Rocchette is a town in the province of Vicenza, Veneto, northern Italy. It is west of SP349 provincial road.

Monte Summano dominates Piovene Rocchette and has been place of religious pilgrimage since the 15th century. On the slopes of Mount Summano is the 17th century chapel of Ospizio which once hosted pilgrims making the trip to Monte Summano. Near the summit of the mountain is the pilgrimage church of Santa Maria del Summano.
