= Antonio Baroni =

Italian painter

Antonio Baroni (1678 – 31 December 1746) was an Italian painter of the late-Baroque period, active in Verona, Republic of Venice. He trained with Simone Brentana in Verona, and then in Bologna with Marcantonio Franceschini. He painted Sacrifice of Isaac for the oratorio di San Biago. He painted a Nativity for the church of San Alessio. He painted Saint Simon the Apostle for the Oratory of San Simone Apostolo, as well as David and the angel with whips.

== Sources ==
- Zannandreis, Diego (1891). Giuseppe Biadego (ed.). Le vite dei pittori, scultori e architetti veronesi. Verona: Stabilimento Tipo-Litografico G. Franchini. p. 343.
