= Francesco Lorenzi =

Italian painter

Francesco Lorenzi (1723 – February 12, 1787) was an Italian painter of the late Baroque period.

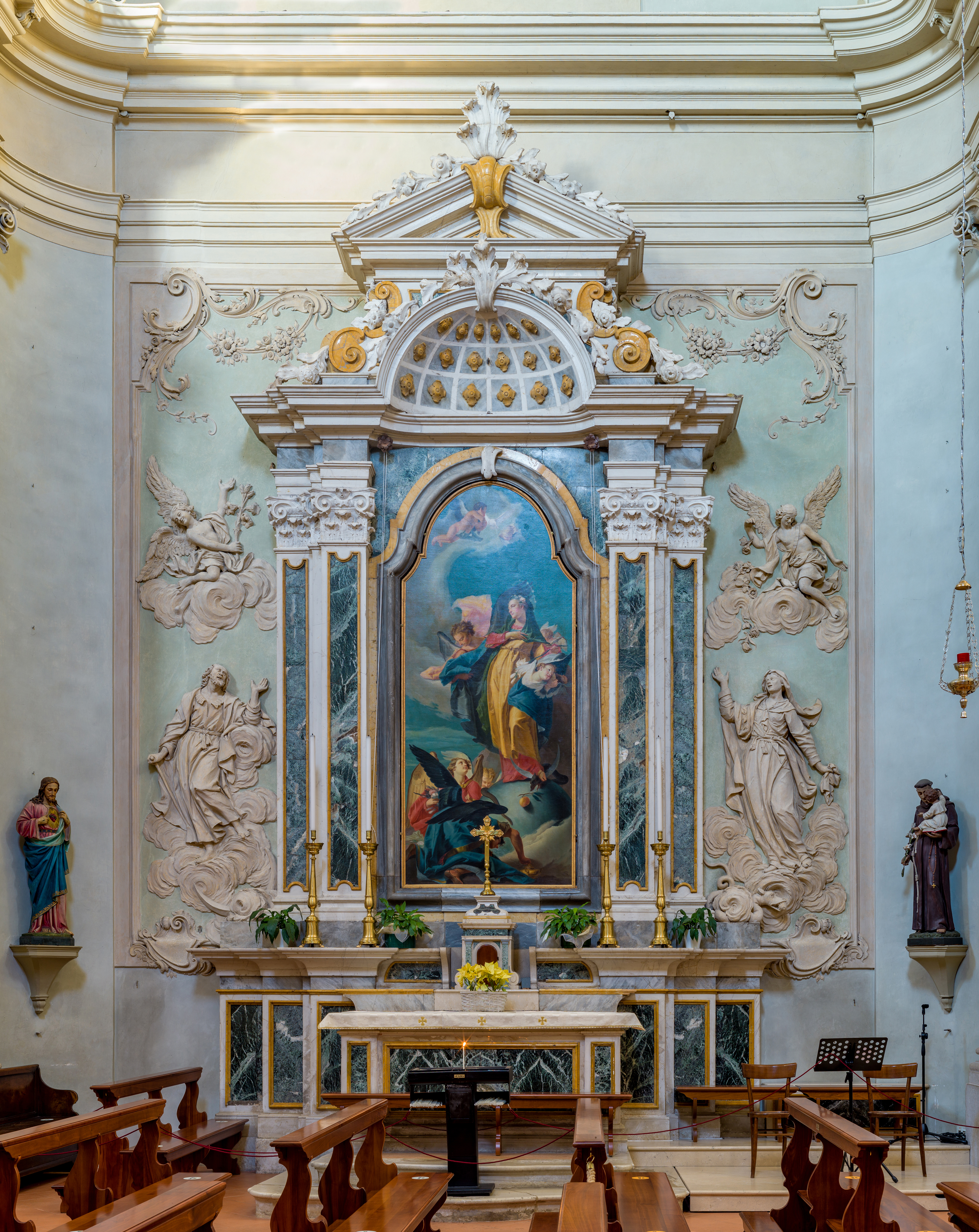
Altar of the Immaculate Conception by Francesco Lorenzi in the Chiesa di San Silvestro church in Brescia

== Biography ==
He was born in Mazzurega near Verona. After training with hs first master, Matteo Brida, in Verona, he went to Venice and became a pupil of Giovanni Battista Tiepolo.

In Venice, he painted an altarpiece for a chapel in Santa Caterina (Venice). In 1750, he returns to Verona, where he obtained many commissions, although he had to compete with his contemporary Giambettino Cignaroli. Many of his works were in fresco. He even set up an academy that competed with Cignaroli, the Accademia Aletofili. He painted a Holy Family for the church of San Lorenzo in Brescia. He was active across the region. Boni quotes two death dates, either 1783 or 1788. He painted the figures while Filippo Maccari painted the quadratura for a room in the casa Ferrari in the San Silvestro. Lorenzi painted a chiaroscuro bust of Maccari himself. Francesco's brother, Giovanni Domenico Lorenzi, was an engraver.
