= Tommaso Dossi =

Italian painter

Tommaso Dossi (1678 – 18 July 1730) was an Italian painter of the late-Baroque period, active in Verona. He trained with Giovanni Murari and then with Simone Brentana. He painted an altarpiece of the Virgin and child with San Filippo Neri for the church of the Padre Filippini. He painted a Santa Eurosia for the parish church of Mazzurega.

== Sources ==
- Zannandreis, Diego (1891). Giuseppe Biadego (ed.). Le vite dei pittori, scultori e architetti veronesi. Verona: Stabilimento Tipo-Litografico G. Franchini. p. 365. "zannandreis."
