= Ottone Calderari =

Palladian architect in Vicenza, Italy

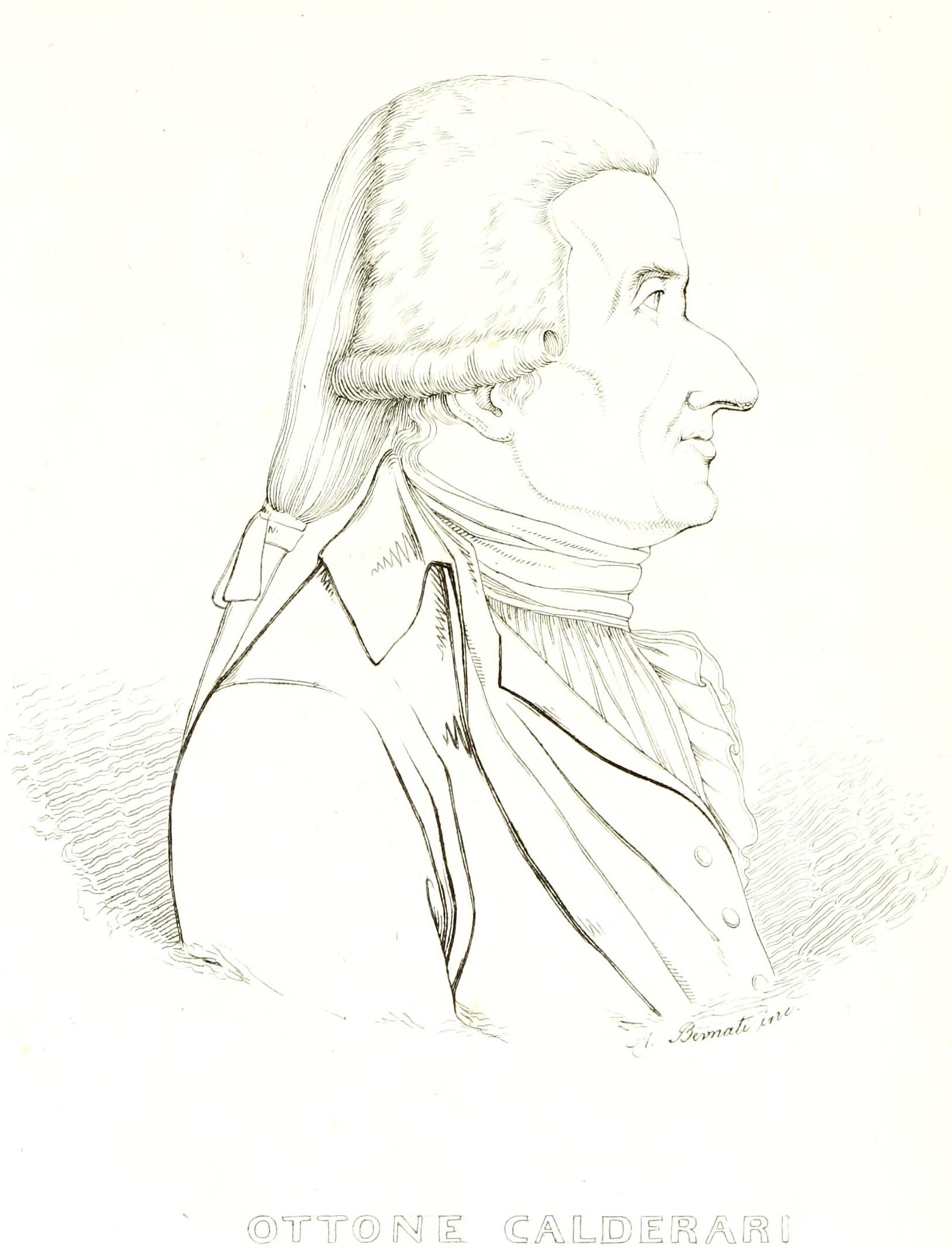
- Ottone Calderari
- Born: 8 September 1730; Vicenza, Republic of Venice
- Died: 26 October 1803 (aged 73); Vicenza, Republic of Venice
- Occupation: Architect
- Movement: Neoclassicism

Ottone Calderari (13 September 1730 – 26 October 1803) was an Italian Neoclassical architect and writer of architectural design. He made the designs for the Palazzi Loschi (Zileri dal Verme), Anti, Sola, Bonini, and Cordellina located in and near Vicenza. He completed the Palazzetto Capra Lampertico for the Capra family. He helped construct the church of Santorso, province of Vicenza. His design for a façade of the church of San Marco in San Girolamo in Vicenza, was later used for San Filippo Neri, Vicenza, by Antonio Piovene. He was active in some of the reconstruction and expansions of Thiene Cathedral. He also worked in Verona, Padua, and Marostica. In his day, he was said to represent a rejuvenated Palladio.

== Biography ==
Calderari was born in Vicenza on 13 September 1730. He was a pupil of Domenico Cerato, developing an extremely conservative trend of Neoclassicism based on Palladio but assimilating contemporary ideas of prismatic form and functional planning; he was heavily influenced by the contemporary publication of Ottavio Bertotti Scamozzi's Le fabbriche e i disegni di Andrea Palladio raccolti e illustrati (1776–83). Bertotti Scamozzi regarded him as having ‘appropriated’ rather than ‘imitated’ Palladio; Quatremère de Quincy called him a ‘rejuvenated Palladio’. He was a prolific architect, building numerous palazzi, villas and churches in the Veneto, and was elected a member of the Institut de France.

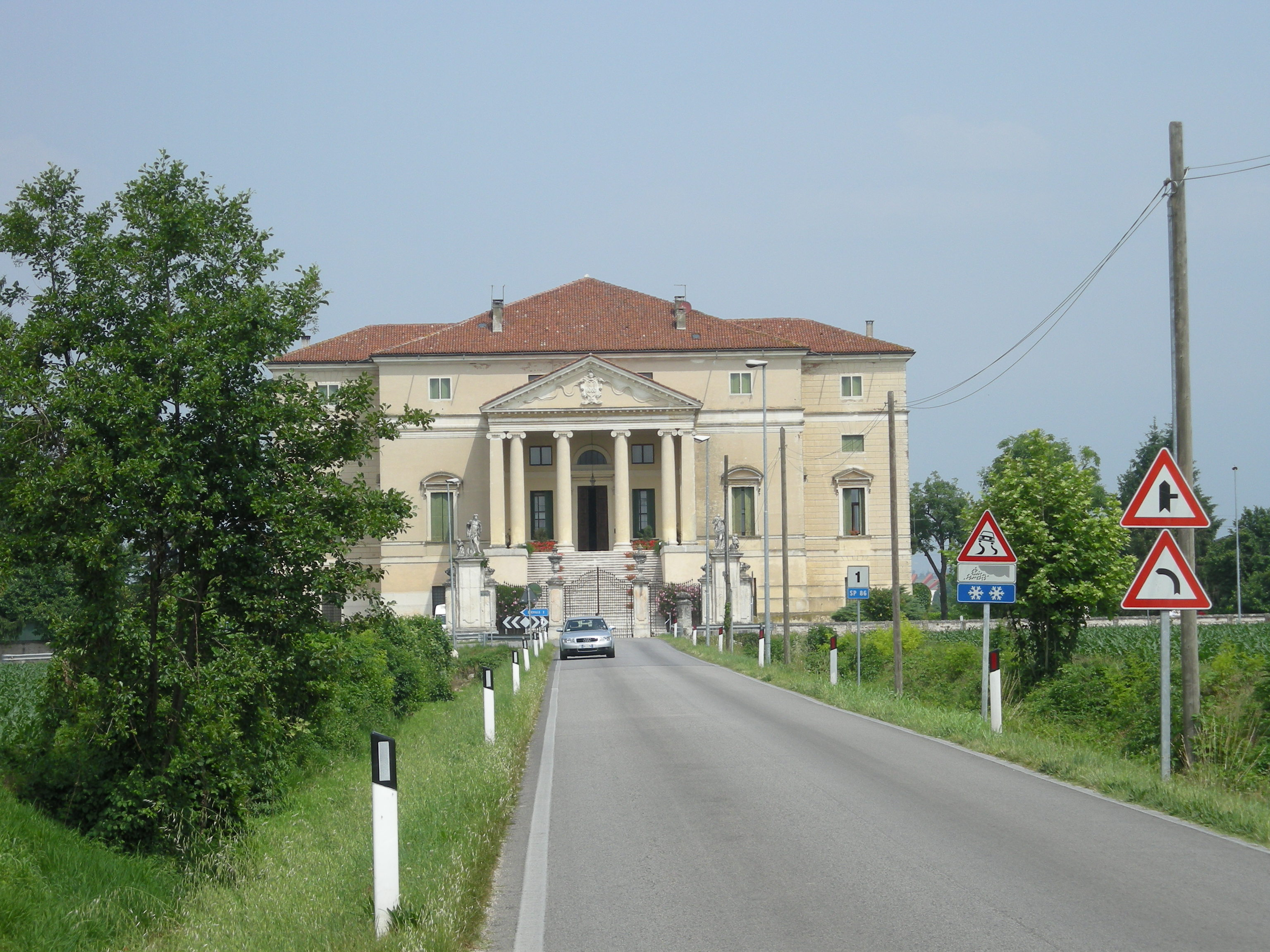
Villa da Porto in Dueville, province of Vicenza, by Ottone Calderari.

Calderari's unexecuted design (1756) for the façade of the church of Padri Scalzi, Vicenza, exemplifies his manner. The composition followed closely that by Palladio for San Giorgio Maggiore (begun 1566), Venice, but the flat planes and the decoration of the frieze were resolutely Neoclassical. The chapels of the Casa Monza (1760), Breganze, and the Villa Porto (1774), Pilastroni di Vivaro, have severe temple façades, with four engaged columns supporting a pediment, but somewhat subordinate wings. The church of Sant'Orso (1777 ), near Vicenza, is centrally planned with an apsidal sanctuary; it was derived from Palladio's unexecuted design for San Nicola da Tolentino (1579), Venice, but with extended chapels. The principal elevation is a reduced version of S Giorgio Maggiore; the decoration and niches appear to be incised in the façade.

Calderari designed a number of magnificent palazzi in Vicenza, each a variation on those by Palladio but more pragmatically planned. The Palazzo Cordellina (1776; partially executed; now Scuola Media) is regarded as his masterpiece. The ground floor and piano nobile of the principal façade feature engaged columns, as at the Palazzo Barbaran da Porto (1570–75) by Palladio. Two magnificent courtyards are separated by a central block containing a cruciform atrium; the cross axis opens on one side to a garden and on the other to an enormous staircase leading to a salone lit by thermal windows.

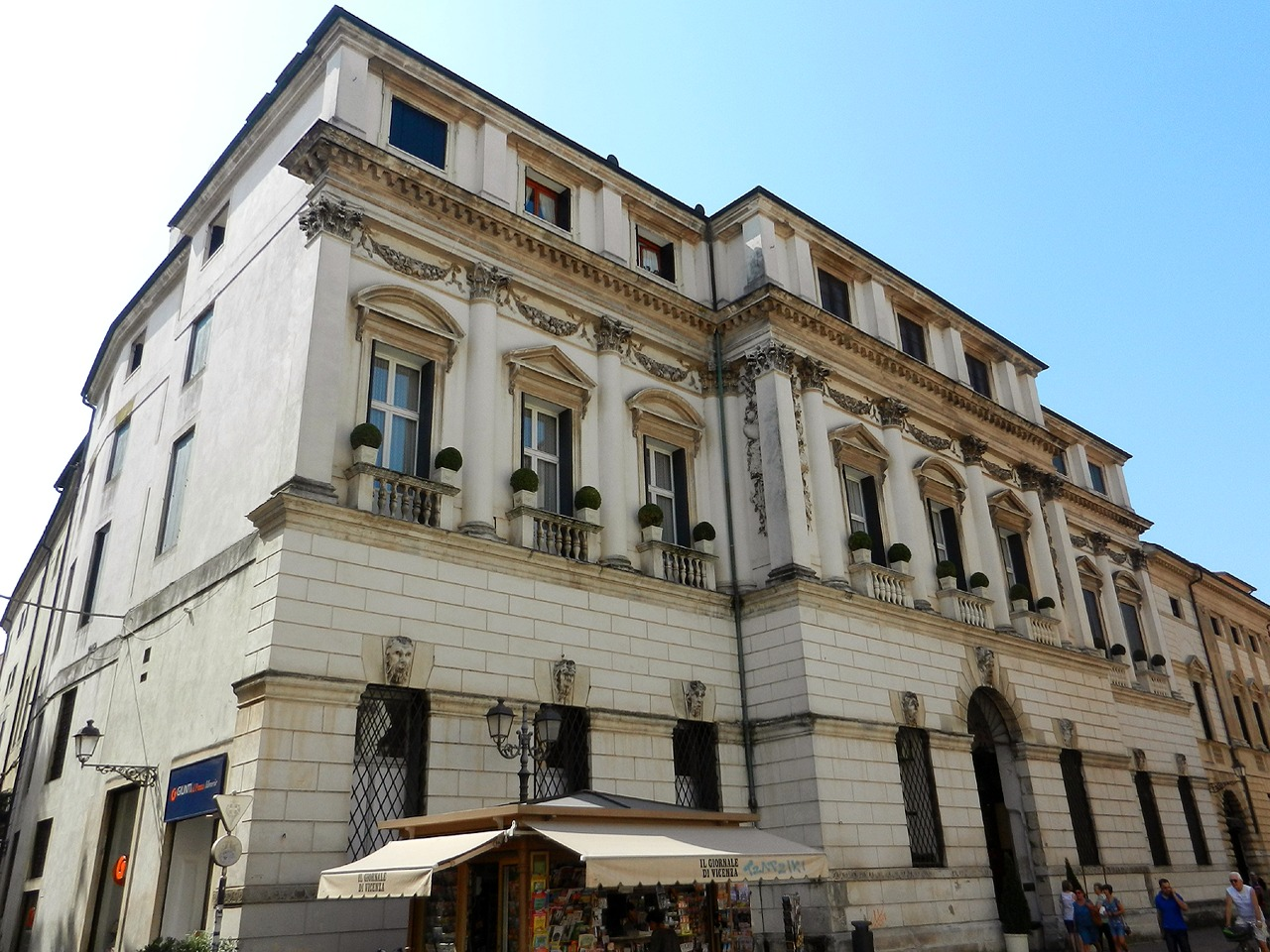
Palazzo Loschi, Vicenza (1782)

Calderari's other palaces in Vicenza were based on Palladio's Palazzo da Porto-Festa (c. 1547): they include the Palazzo Quinto (n.d.; unexecuted), the Palazzo Loschi (1782), with three projecting central bays, and the Palazzo Salvi (1784; partially executed), also with three projecting central bays and an unusual oval staircase in a tower rising above the adjacent roofs. Calderari's villas were usually modelled on Palladio's Villa Foscari (c. 1558): they include the Casino Todaro (1785; now Dolcetta), Campedello, the Villa Anti (1772; partially executed) and the Casino Fontanella (designed 1766, executed 1799; now Girotto). The Villa Porto (1776–8; partially executed), Pilastroni di Vivaro, however, was derived from Palladio's Villa Cornaro (1551–3) but with more dominant wings.

Calderari designed several more modest dwellings, such as the Palazzo Bonin (1785), with an Ionic colonnade supporting the upper storeys, the Casa Capra (1803; now Lampertico), the Casa Disconzi (c. 1802), and the Casa Zanchi (1773), Padua. Calderari acted as consultant on the restoration of several buildings by Palladio, in particular the Basilica (1778) and the Teatro Olimpico, on which he also wrote a treatise; in 1762 he proposed painting the ceiling of the auditorium as a velarium (executed 1827–8; destr. 1914).

== Writings ==
- Calderari, Ottone (1847). "Discorso sopra la copertura del Teatro Olimpico". In Antonio Magini (ed.). Scritture inedite in materia di architettura. Padua.

== See also ==
- Palladian architecture

== Sources ==
- Boni, Filippo de' (1852). Biografia degli artisti ovvero dizionario della vita e delle opere dei pittori, degli scultori, degli intagliatori, dei tipografi e dei musici di ogni nazione che fiorirono da'tempi più remoti sino á nostri giorni. Seconda Edizione.. Venice; Googlebooks: Presso Andrea Santini e Figlio. p. 167.
- Barbieri, Franco (1953). "Il neoclassico vicentino: Ottone Calderari". Arte veneta. 7: 63–78.
