= Domenico Corbellini =

Italian architect and engineer

Domenico Corbellini (c. 1716 – 21 May 1790) was an Italian architect and engineer, active in Brescia.

He was born in the hamlet of Pellio Superiore, now part of Alta Valle Intelvi, in the province of Como in the Italian region Lombardy, near the Swiss border. He was the son of the architect Antonio Corbellini. In 1737 he helped design a bell-tower in Capriano del Colle, where he worked with his father. Among his works include the main altar (1743) of the parish church of Esine; the oratory of San Francesco (1745) in Lignolo in Castenedolo; the private oratory (1745) of the brothers Antonio and Seriato Inselvini in Barco di Bornato; the parish church (1748) of Pontoglio; Parish church of San Felice del Benaco (1749, completed 1781); parish church (1750) in Collio of Val Trompia; San Lorenzo (1751); main altar (1755) and church (1760) of the Parish of Manerbio along with his brother. Domenico died in Brescia.
