= Matteo Brida =

Italian painter

Matteo Brida (1699-1744) was an Italian painter active mainly in his native Verona, Republic of Venice.

He trained under Padre Simbenati in Verona, who also trained Giovanni Battista Caregari Targa. Among the pupils or those influenced by Brida are Felice Boscaratti and Francesco Lorenzi. The painting restorer, Luca Brida, is thought to be his son.

He painted two prophets for the church of San Marco in San Girolamo in Vicenza.
