= Helena Corbellini =

Uruguayan writer and professor

- Born: Gloria Helena Corbellini Troche; 7 January 1959 (age 67); Montevideo, Uruguay
- Education: Instituto de Profesores Artigas
- Occupations: Writer, professor

Gloria Helena Corbellini Troche (born 7 January 1959) is a Uruguayan writer and professor.

== Biography ==
Helena Corbellini was born in Montevideo in 1959 and has lived in Colonia del Sacramento since 2001.

She graduated as a professor of literature at the Instituto de Profesores Artigas. She was a secondary school teacher and teaches classes at the Regional Center for Teachers in Colonia. She has worked in the Municipality of Montevideo's Department of Culture, in workshops organized by the Ministry of Education and Culture, in the Council of Education Training, and the Uruguay Study Program.

As a cultural journalist, Corbellini has contributed to Zeta, Brecha, El País Cultural, and La República. In Maldonado she directed the magazine Asterisco. She is the author of poetry, novels, and texts aimed at students. Her stories have been published in anthologies of the genre.

Her novels include La vida brava. Los amores de Horacio Quiroga (2007), on the life of Horacio Quiroga, El sublevado. Garibaldi, corsario del Río de La Plata (2009), on the voyage of Giuseppe Garibaldi to Montevideo seen from the perspective of a female character, and Hay una cierva menos en el monte (2012), inspired by the 2004 homicide of a woman by her ex-husband in Conchillas, Colonia Department.

In 2014 the National Public Education Administration (ANEP) published Ilustrados y valientes, a book in which Corbellini collected, in the framework of her time in the Uruguay Study Program, testimonies of students and teachers from various points in Uruguay who worked on this program between 2009 and 2014.

Corbellini is responsible for the Mario Levrero Archive in the Faculty of Humanities and Education Sciences of the University of the Republic.

== Works ==
=== Poetry ===
- Manuscrito hallado al este del Edén (Ed. Mirador, 1992)
- Círculo de sangre (Civiles iletrados, 2002)

=== Novels ===
- Laura Sparsi (Cal y Canto, 1995)
- La novia secreta del Corto Maltés (Fin de Siglo, 2000)
- La vida brava. Los amores de Horacio Quiroga (Sudamericana, 2007)
- El Sublevado. Garibaldi en el Río de la Plata (Sudamericana, 2009)
- Mi corazón pesa demasiado (illustrations by Fernando Cabezudo, 2008)
- Hay una cierva menos en el monte (Sudamericana, 2012)

=== Other works ===
- Roberto Arlt. La isla desierta (Ed. Técnica, 1991)
- Eugene O'Neill (Ed. Técnica, 1992)
- "Ida Vitale", in Historia de la Literatura Uruguaya Contemporánea, tomo II (Banda Oriental, 1997)
- Ilustrados y valientes (ANEP, 2014)
