= Lodovico Buffetti =

Italian painter (1722–1782)

- Born: 1722; Verona, Republic of Venice
- Died: March 1782 (aged 59–60); Vicenza, Republic of Venice

Lodovico Buffetti (1722 –March 1782) was an Italian painter.

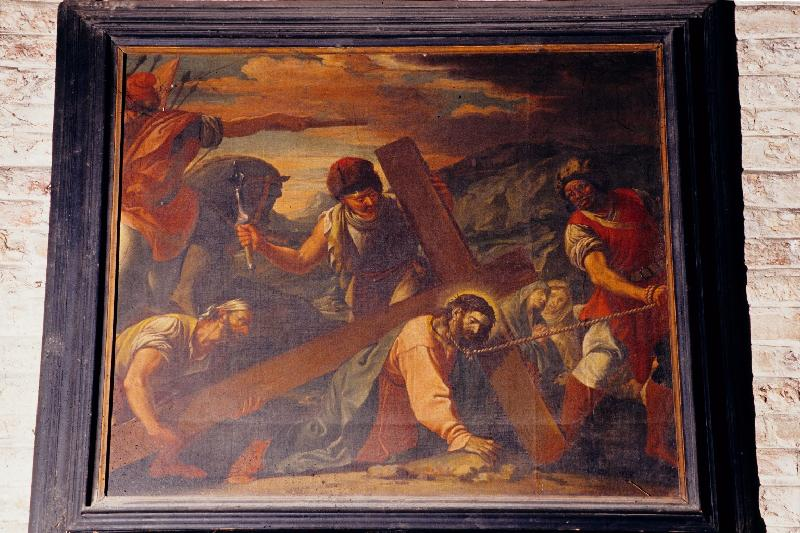
Jésus tombe sous la Croix

== Biography ==
Born in Verona, Republic of Venice to a pharmacist, he trained there under Simone Brentana, but moved to and worked mainly in Vicenza. He painted sacred subjects. His son, Giuseppe Buffetti, also became a painter.

He painted an altarpiece depicting St Vincent Ferrer performing miracle for San Pietro in Monastero. He painted a Marriage of the Virgin and a Glory of St Joseph for the suppressed Oratory of Santa Caterina presso Ognissanti. He painted a St Augustine meditating on the Trinity for the church of Santa Eufemia. For the church of Santi Eleuterio e Barbara, he painted a Santi Coronati. For the church of the Filippini in Vicenza, he painted St Anne, Virgin and young John the Baptist; Samaritan at the well with Jesus; and Dinner at Emmaus. He also painted for the churches for San Girolamo, San Jacopo, and Santa Maria Maddalena.
