= Alessandro Maganza =

Italian painter (1556–1630)

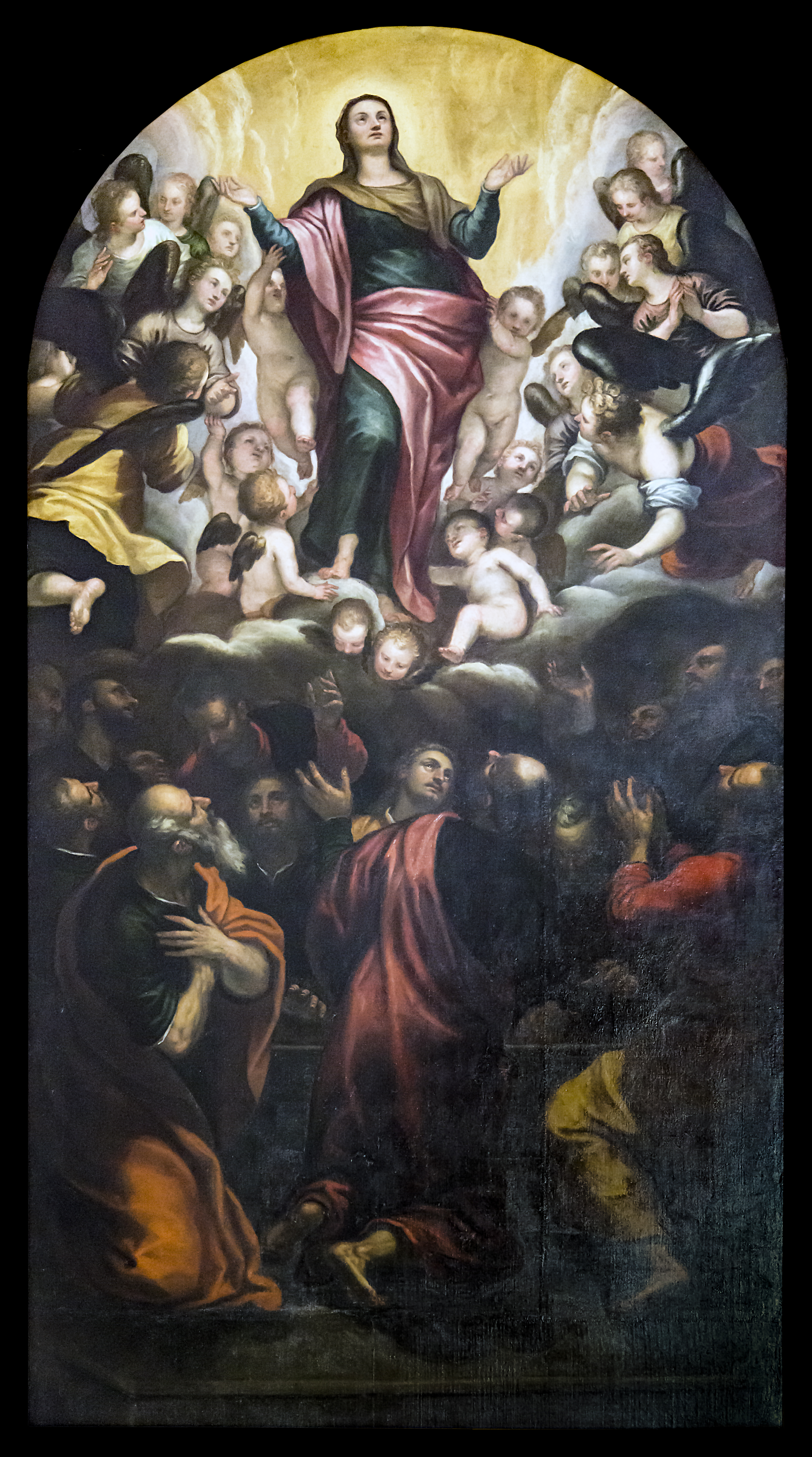
Adorazione della Vergine con gli Angeli (1581)

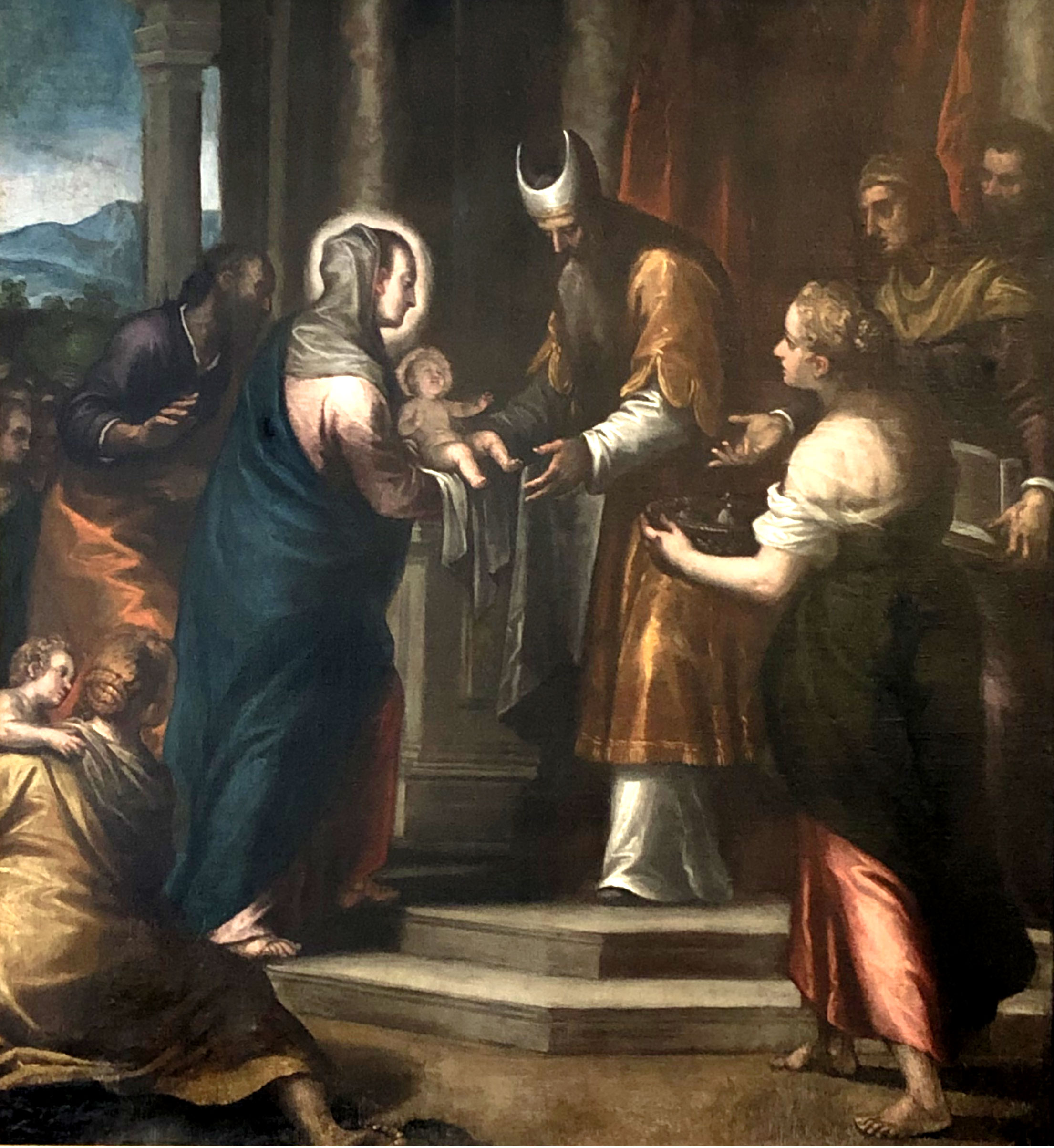
Presentation of Jesus in temple / Candlemas

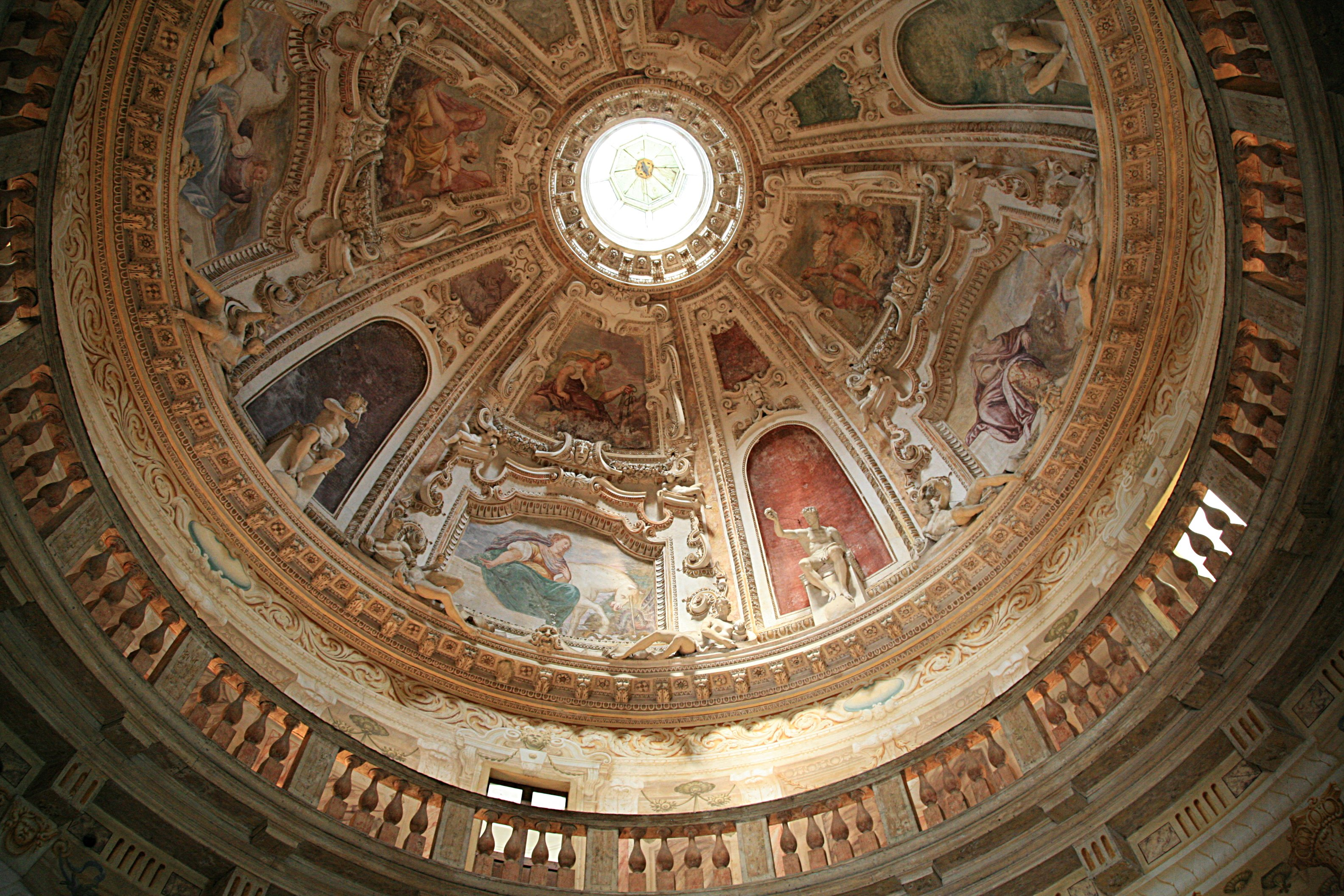
Villa Capra "La Rotonda"

Alessandro Maganza (1556–1630) was an Italian painter of the Mannerist style, born and active in Vicenza, as well as in Venice.

He likely trained with his father, Giovanni Battista Maganza, also a painter; as well as by Giovanni Antonio Fasolo. He is said to have spent the years 1572–76 in Venice. His first documented work, Virgin and Child with Four Evangelists (1580) was painted for the monastery built around the basilica and sanctuary of Monte Berico in Vicenza. Maganza also frescoed the inner cupola of Palladio's famous Villa Rotonda located near Vicenza, with allegorical figures in colour, again recalling the Paolo Veronese; he also executed large ceiling canvases in tempera for the South and West rooms. His style is described as derivative of Palma il Giovane. He had three sons who became painters: Giovanni Battista the younger, Marcantonio, and Girolamo.

== Works ==
=== Vicenza ===
- Madonna and Child with four Evangelists, 1580, Santuario della Madonna di Monte Berico
- Santi Vincenzo e Marco che presentano la città di Vicenza alla Vergine, 1581, Vicenza Cathedral
- Adorazione della Vergine con gli Angeli, 1581 Vicenza Cathedral
- Adoration of the Magi, 1582, Thiene, private collection of Porto Colleoni
- St Valentine heals the sick 1584-1585, Basilica dei Santi Felice e Fortunato
- Pietà e santi, 1585, Vicenza, Santa Croce church
- Sei tele per la cappella del Santissimo Sacramento, 1587-1589, Vicenza Cathedral:
  - Ultima Cena
  - Orazione nell'orto
  - Flagellazione
  - L'imperatore concede i privilegi ai notai, Pinacoteca di Brera, Milan
  - Il doge conferma i privilegi ai notai, Milano, Pinacoteca di Brera
- Prayer in the Garden and Flagellation, late 1500s, Palazzo Chiericati
- Battesimo di Cristo, 1591, Vicenza, Santuario della Madonna di Monte Berico
- San Gerolamo Emiliani con alcuni bimbi di fronte a Cristo e alla Madonna, 1592, Vicenza, Chiesa della Misericordia
- Cristo dona le corone ai santi Pietro e Paolo, 1596, San Pietro
- Martyrdom of Saint Justine, 1596, San Pietro
- San Benedetto accoglie san Mauro, 1596, Vicenza, San Pietro church
- St Bonaventure receives eucharist from an Angel, 1598, Palazzo Chiericati, Vicenza
- Pietà, 1600, San Pietro
- Cristo morto e donatori, 1600, Schio, Chiesa di San Francesco
- Trinità adorata dai santi Alessandro e Gennaro vescovo, 1600 circa, San Vito di Leguzzano, parish church
- Tredici teleri per il soffitto della Chiesa di San Domenico, 1603-1604, Vicenza, San Domenico church
- Madonna of the Rosary), (1604 - 1608), Barbarano Vicentino, parish church
- Nativity, 1605, Filippini
- Sei piccoli riquadri per l'antico tabernacolo della cappella del Sacramento della Cattedrale, 1606, Vicenza, Curia vescovile:
  - Risen Christ
  - Faith, Hope, Temperance, and Charity)
  - Padre Eterno
- Allegory of Religion and the Virtue, date uncertain, Villa Almerico Capra
- San Vincenzo (Saint Vincent), 1613, Thiene, San Vincenzo church
- Triumph of Sebastian Venier's, Victorious Over the Turks), 1619, Santa Corona
- Martyrdom of Saint Andrew), San Pietro
- Martirio dei santi Leonzio e Carpoforo (Martyr of Saints Leontius and Carpophore), Vicenza Cathedral

=== Padua ===
- Trasfigurazione, Padova, San Benedetto Vecchio
- Adorazione dei Magi (Adoration of the Magi), Padova, San Gaetano Church
- Disputa tra i dottori, Padova, San Gaetano church
- Pietà, Padova, San Gaetano church
- Santa Caterina (Saint Catherine), Padova, San Gaetano church
- Gesù salva Pietro e gli Apostoli, attribuita, Padova, San Gaetano church

== Other ==
- Portrait of Maddalena Campiglia, Musei civici di Vicenza

== See also ==
- Mannerism

== Sources ==
- Grove Dictionary of Art
- Freedberg, Sydney J. (1993). Pelican History of Art (ed.). Painting in Italy, 1500–1600. Penguin Books Ltd. p. 565.
