= Costantino Pasqualotto =

Italian painter

Costantino Pasqualotto, also called il Costantini (1681 - 1755) was an Italian painter of the late-Baroque period in Vicenza.

He was born in Vicenza. He was a pupil of Giulio Carpioni and under a Volpato.
