= Brenta (river) =

Coordinates: 45°11′N 12°19′E

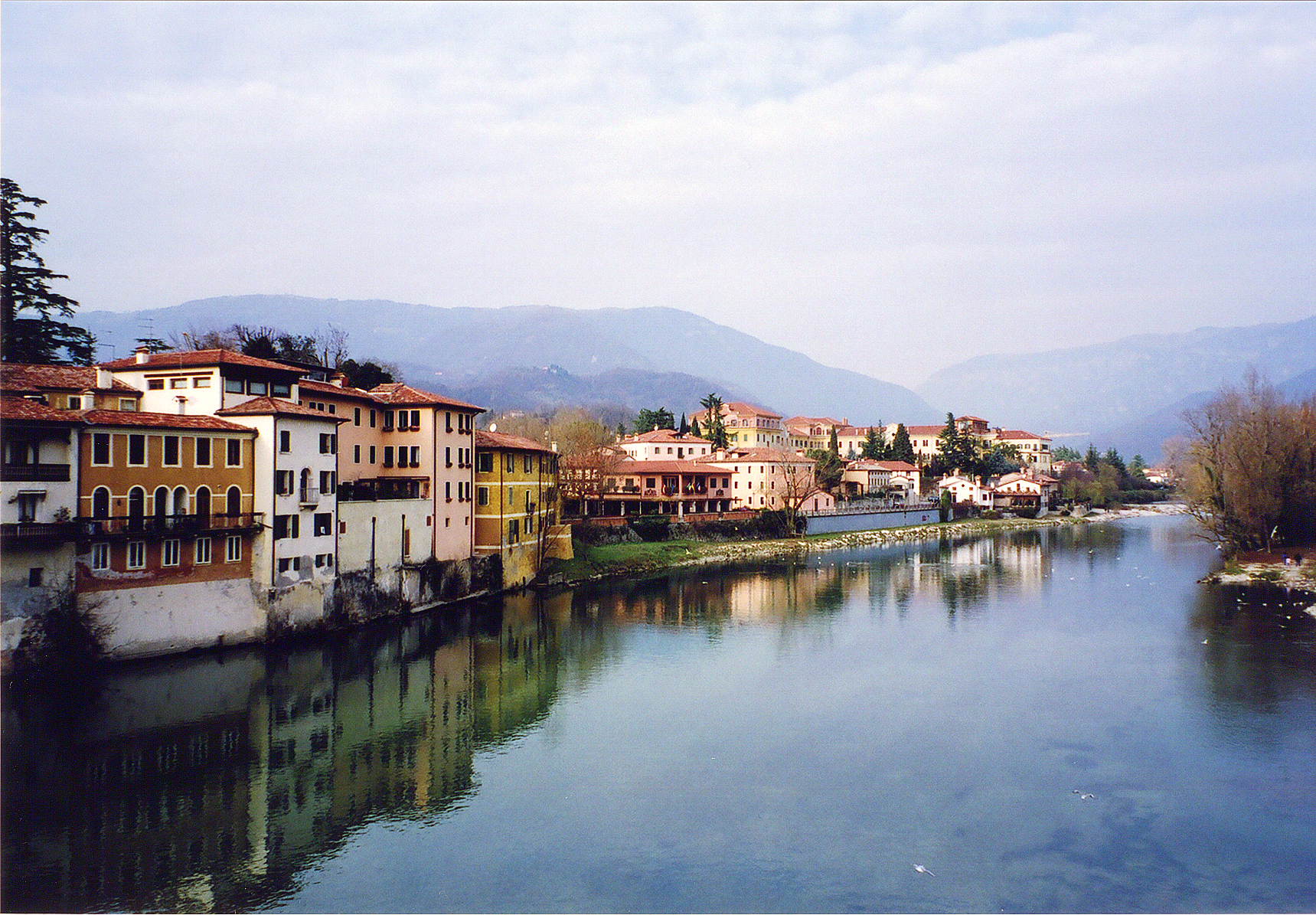
- The Brenta at Bassano del Grappa

Location
- Country: Italy

Physical characteristics
- Source
  - location: From the lakes Levico and Caldonazzo
  - elevation: 450 m (1,480 ft)
- Mouth
  - location: Adriatic
- Length: 174 km (108 mi)
- Basin size: 2,300 km^{2} (890 sq mi)
- Discharge
  - average: Bassano del Grappa 60 to 90 m^{3}/s (2,100 to 3,200 cu ft/s); Barzizza 93 m^{3}/s (3,300 cu ft/s)

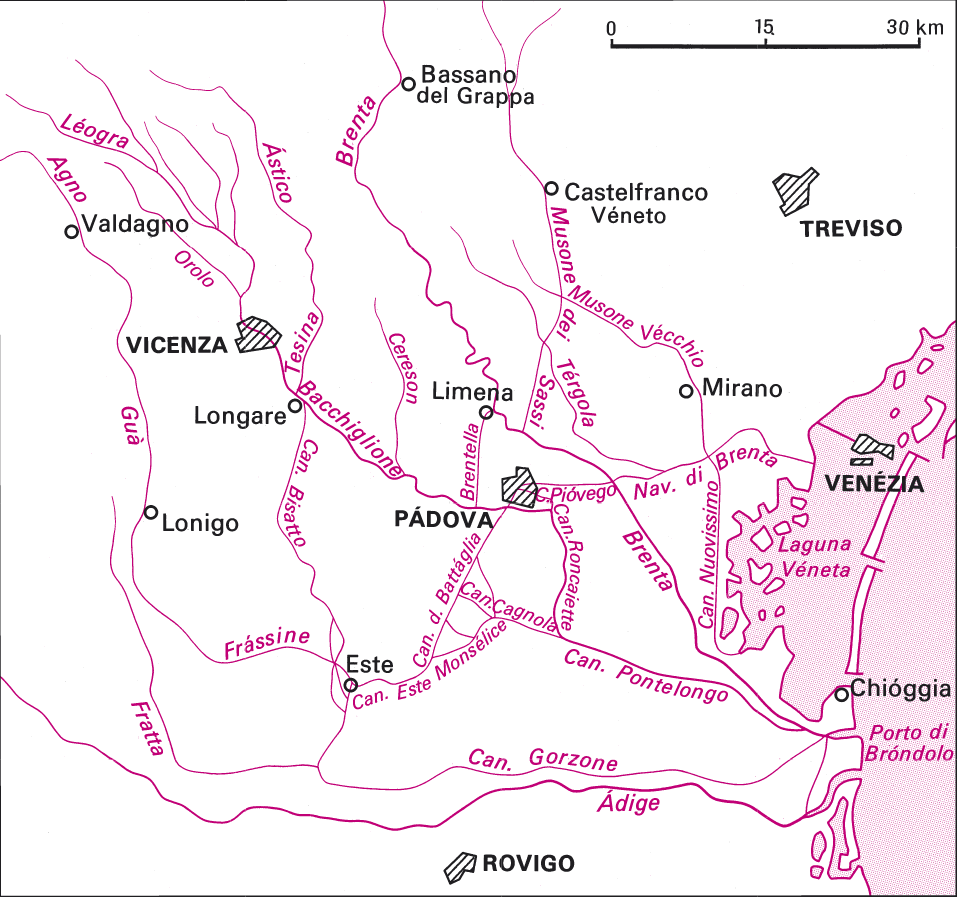
Map of the Brenta-Bacchiglione river system

The Brenta is an Italian river that runs from Trentino to the Adriatic Sea just south of the Venetian lagoon in the Veneto region, in the north-east of Italy.

During the Roman era, it was called Medoacus (Ancient Greek: Mediochos, Μηδειοχος) and near Padua it divided into two branches, Medoacus Maior (Greater Medoacus) and Medoacus Minor (Lesser Medoacus). The river changed its course in the early Middle Ages, and its former bed through Padua was occupied by the Bacchiglione.

It is 174 kilometres (108 mi) long and was first channelled in the 16th century when a long canal was built from the village of Stra to the Adriatic Sea, bypassing the Venetian lagoon. A branch of the Brenta, named Naviglio del Brenta, was left to connect directly Venice and Padua (which was a kind of second capital of the Venice Republic). It runs through Stra, Fiesso d'Artico, Dolo, Mira, Oriago and Malcontenta to Fusina (which is part of the comune of Venice).

Starting in the 16th century, many large villas were built along the shores of the Naviglio del Brenta, and this inhabited area was subsequently named Riviera del Brenta. Three of these villas are open to the public: the massive baroque Villa Pisani in Stra, Villa Widmann-Foscari in Mira, and the Palladian building of Villa Foscari, also called "La Malcontenta". Villa Ferretti-Angeli in Dolo is also on the Riviera. Northwest of Padua, near the village of Piazzola sul Brenta, not far from the river, Villa Contarini is open. The Venetian aristocracy used to cruise along the canal on a type of boat known as a burchiello, while cargo was carried on traditional barges known as burci.

In Bassano del Grappa, the river is crossed by the Ponte Vecchio (Italian, meaning Old bridge), or Ponte degli Alpini (bridge of the Alpini), a covered bridge designed by Palladio in 1569. The pontoon-style bridge is built completely of wood. It has been destroyed several times, and was last rebuilt by the Alpini in 1948.

== See also ==
- Battle of Brenta
- Girolamo Francesco Cristiani
