= Rene Caovilla =

Italian fashion designer

René Caovilla
- Born: René Fernando Caovilla; October 20, 1938 (age 86); Fiesso D’Artico, Italy
- Occupation: Shoe designer
- Years active: 1960s–present
- Known for: Luxurious evening shoes
- Notable work: Cleo Sandals, Chandelier Sandals, Margot Sandals
- Father: Edoardo Caovilla
- Family: Edoardo Caovilla (son)
- Website: https://www.renecaovilla.com/gb/en/

Rene Caovilla, born in 1938 in Fiesso D’Artico (VE), Italy, is an Italian shoe designer within the fashion industry.

== Biography ==
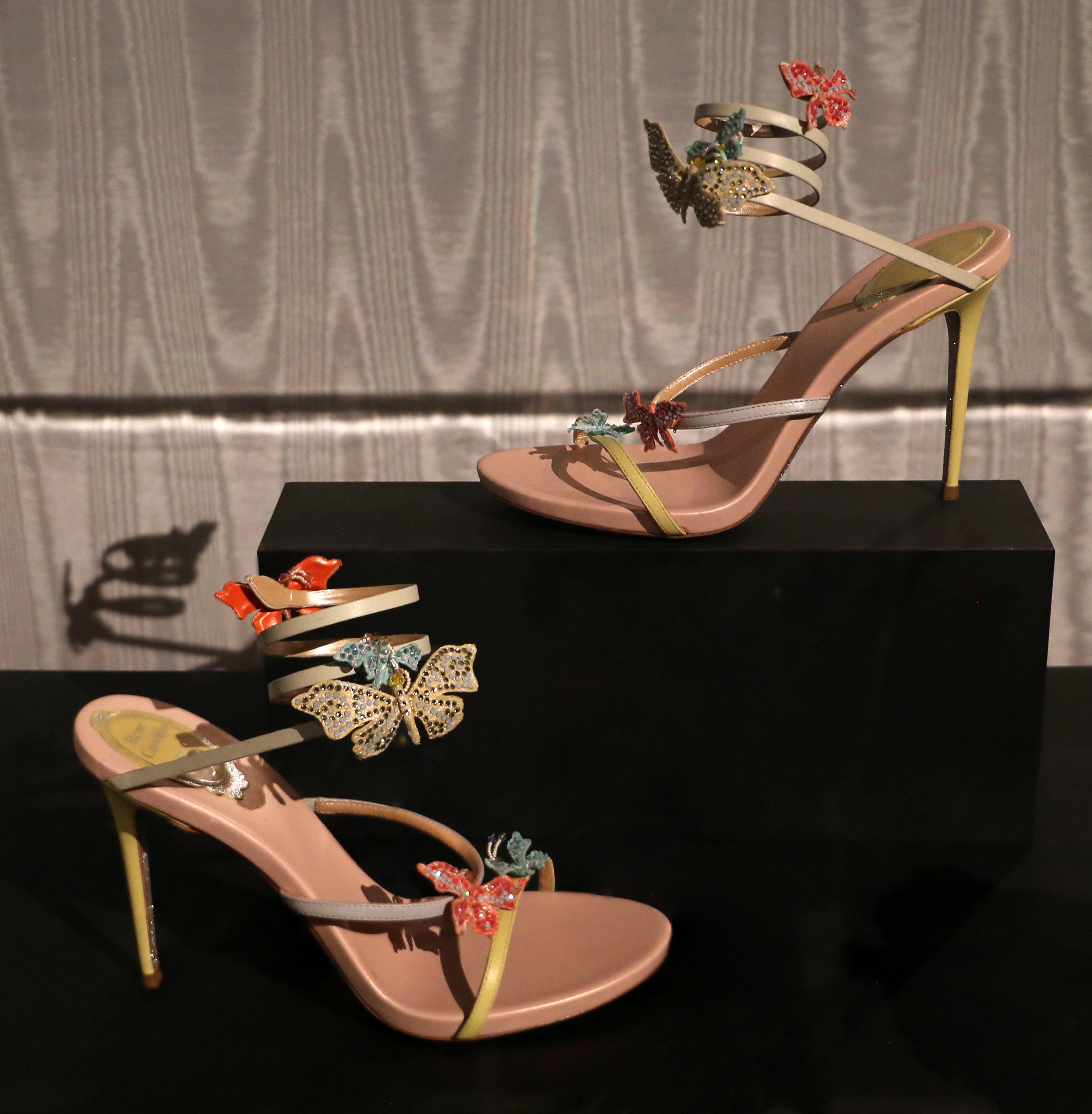
'Snake Sandles' by René Caovilla

Edoardo Caovilla, the father of Rene Fernando, studied under Luigi Voltan, recognized as the initial shoemaker in Riviera del Brenta. Edoardo demonstrated a preference for upscale fashion, blending artisanal techniques with couture. His wife engaged in hand-embroidering shoes alongside four other individuals in a small room, a historical facet preserved within the Caovilla factory.

In 1950, Rene Caovilla pursued design studies in Paris and London before returning to collaborate with his father. By the early 1960s, he assumed leadership of the family enterprise from his father and encountered his future wife, Paola, at a shoe fair. Hailing from a family entrenched in the footwear industry, Paola assumed responsibilities in public relations and oversaw the Caovilla handbag line. Rene concentrated on the upscale segment of the market, specializing in lavish evening shoes acclaimed for their embellishments and craftsmanship.

During the 1970s, Rene worked with Valentino Garavani, and then with Christian Dior and Chanel in the 1980s. Subsequently, in 2000, while collaborating with Karl Lagerfeld, he started creating jeweled footwear.

On September 10, 2007, Harrods employed a live Egyptian cobra to provide security for the shoe counter, safeguarding a pair of haute couture sandals adorned with rubies, sapphires, and diamonds, designed by Caovilla.

Various celebrities, including Jennifer Aniston, Tyra Banks, Heidi Klum, Kim Kardashian, and Rihanna, have been observed donning footwear designed by Rene Caovilla.
