= Riviera del Brenta =

Coastal river area in Venice, Italy

Coordinates: 45°24′46″N 12°03′09″E

The Riviera del Brenta is an area of the Metropolitan City of Venice of particular tourist-cultural interest due to the great architectural heritage of the Venetian villas built between the 15th and 18th centuries by the nobles of the Venetian Republic along the river Brenta (now Naviglio del Brenta).

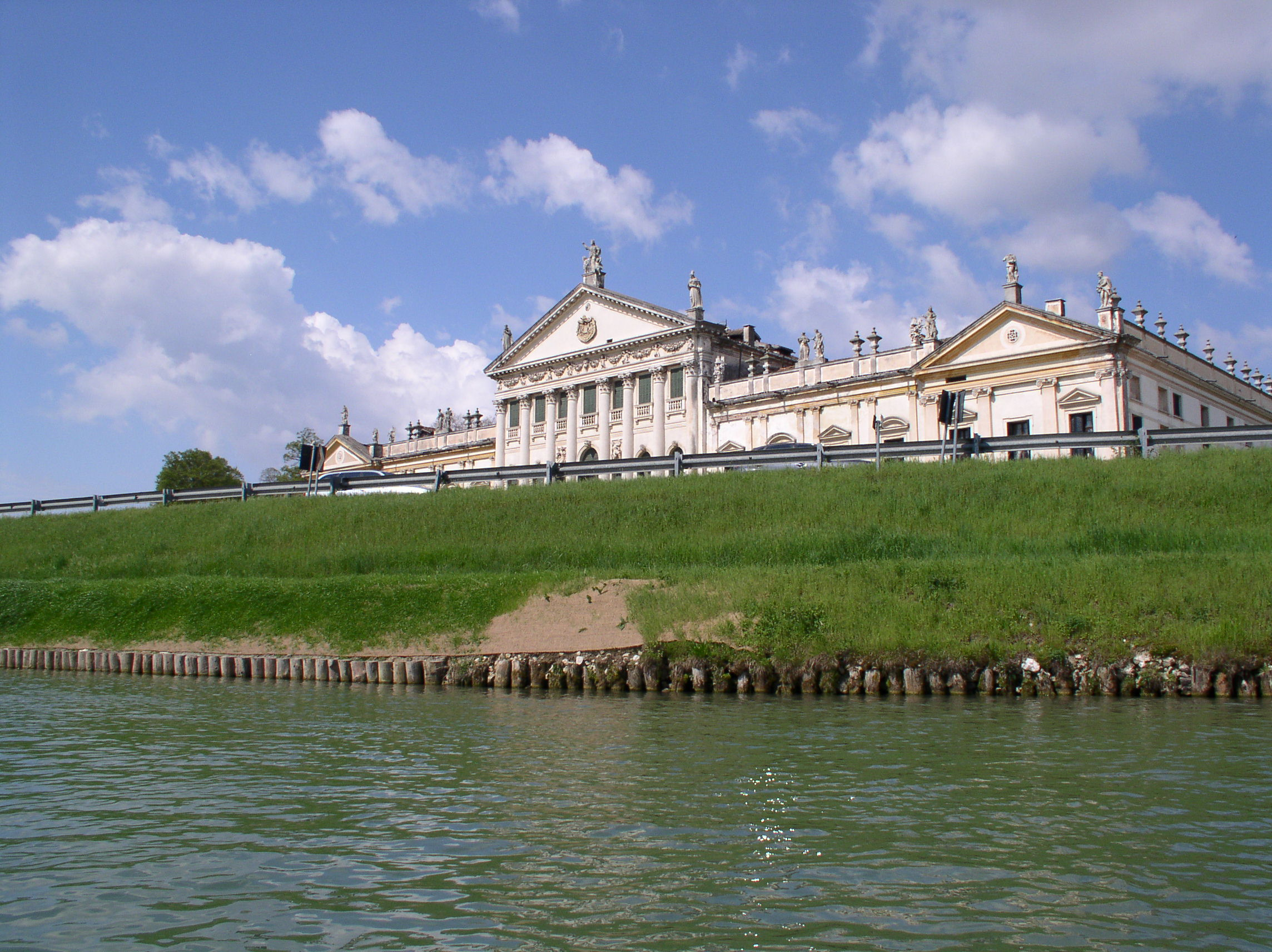
The Brenta Canal at Stra

This territory is the natural way of communication (by land or by river) between two large cities, Padua and Venice, and then over the centuries has become the holiday resort of wealthy patrons coming from the two capitals.

Driving along the Brenta Canal starting from Padua, the cities that are part of the Brenta Riviera are Stra, Fiesso d'Artico, Dolo, Mira, Oriago, Malcontenta and Fusina.

The "Naviglio" is navigable by riverboats, whose best example is the famous burchiello, which once used to carry Venetian noblemen from Venice to the countryside and Padua, and which is now a tourist attraction.

On the territory of the Riviera del Brenta, in addition to the Venetian villas, the panoramic views along the Naviglio del Brenta and the small villages that make up the historic centers of the Riviera itself, there are other attractions have arisen over the last century; for example, one of the most important centers for the development, design, and production of high fashion footwear was founded and developed here.

Along the main road that runs along the Riviera del Brenta, the famous Venice Marathon takes place once a year, in the month of October. The event takes place at the traditional distance of 42.195 km and starts from Stra (in front of the magnificent Villa Pisani) to end in the historic center of Venice.

== History of the Venetian villas ==
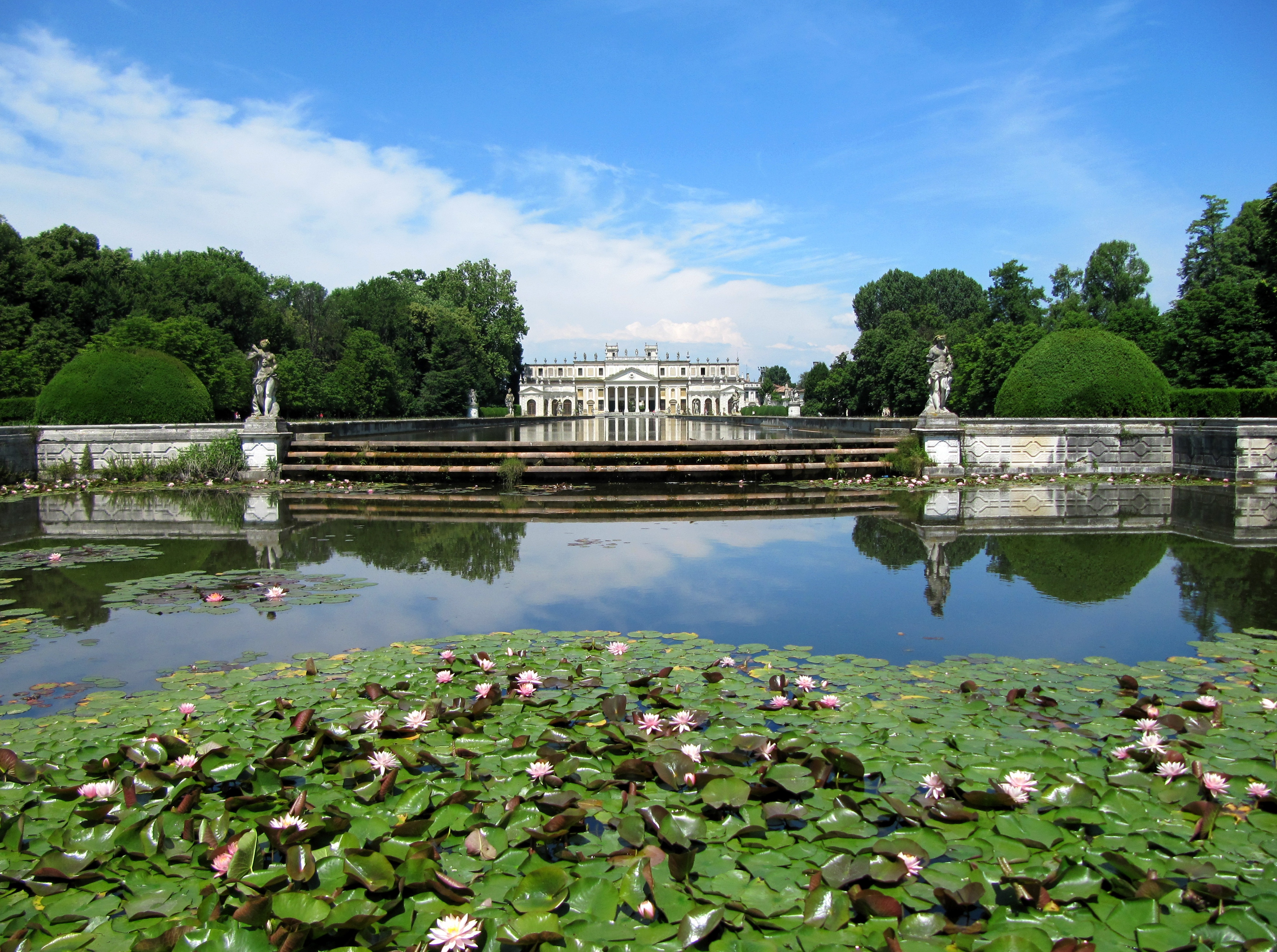
Villa Pisani and gardens at Stra

From the 15th to the 18th century many Venetian aristocratic families built their villas here (like Villa Pisani, Stra, Villa Ferretti-Angeli in Dolo, Villa Widmann-Foscari in Mira, and Villa Foscari (also known as La Malcontenta) in Malcontenta). They are known as ville venete (Venetian villas).

Noblemen used to re-invest their trade profit in big agricultural estates, which were not just countryside manors, but real, self-sustainable production complexes; they were surrounded by fields and had agricultural annexes. The villa was the name of this kind of complex, but today it refers to the manors only. Some of them also have beautiful gardens, with small woods, fountains, mazes, and small lakes. The villa Veneta is typical of all the regions of Veneto, but the Riviera del Brenta is home to some of the most beautiful and famous ones, even if there are other exceptional examples of villas such as Villa Contarini, Villa Capra "La Rotonda" or Villa Barbarigo). Many of the villas are in the Palladian style, and a few were designed by Andrea Palladio himself or by his pupil Vincenzo Scamozzi.

== Venetian villas ==
Here you may find the main villas, and the municipality which they belong to.

=== Mira ===
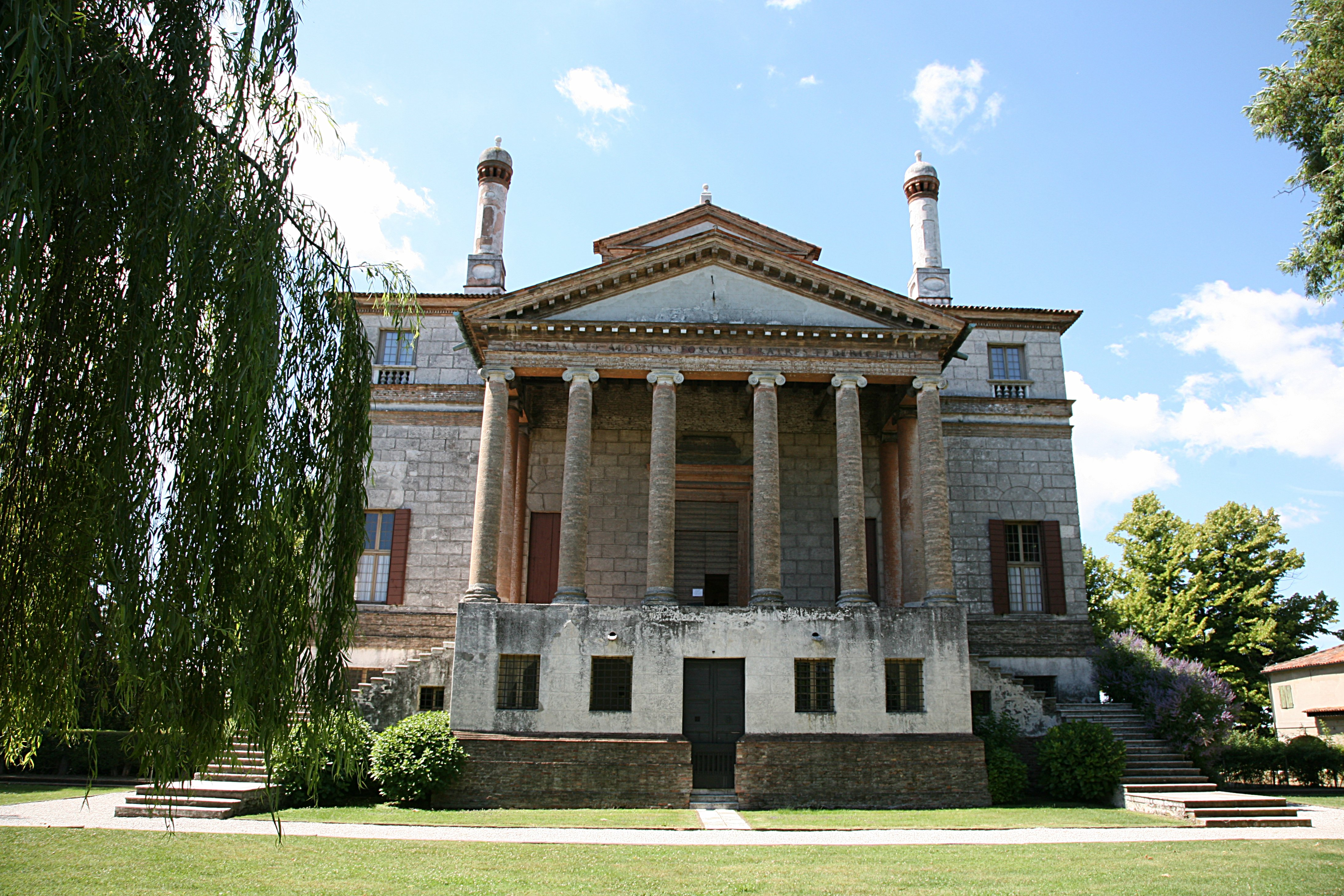
Villa Foscari

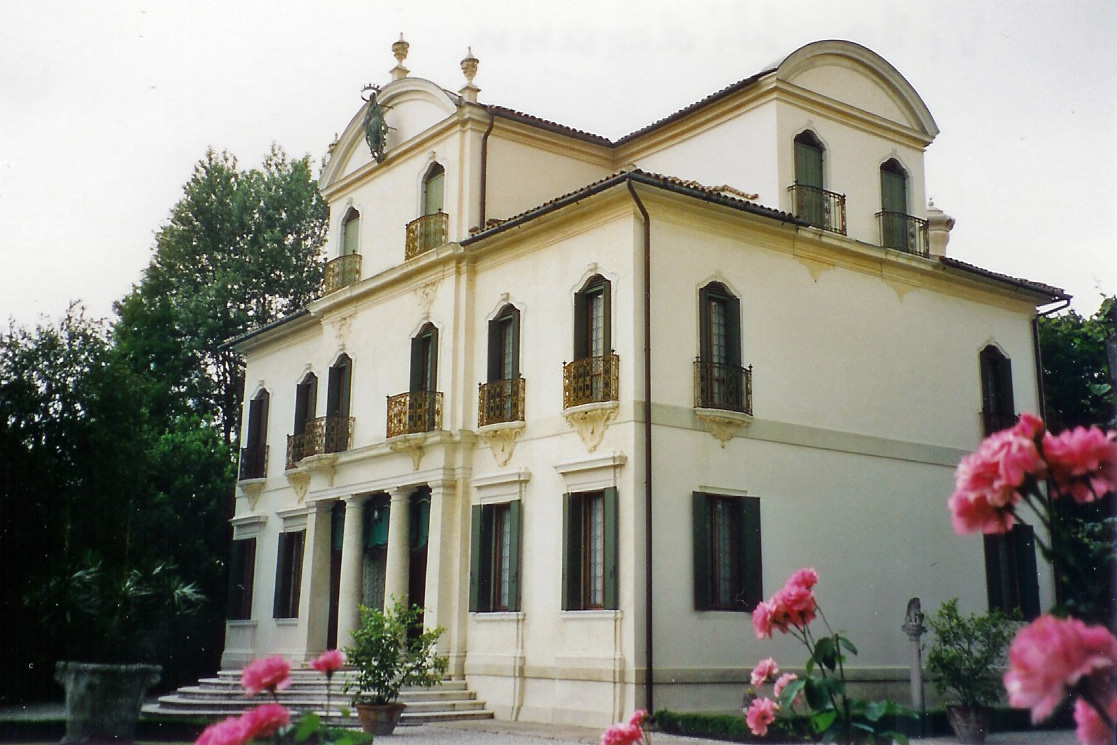
Villa Widmann

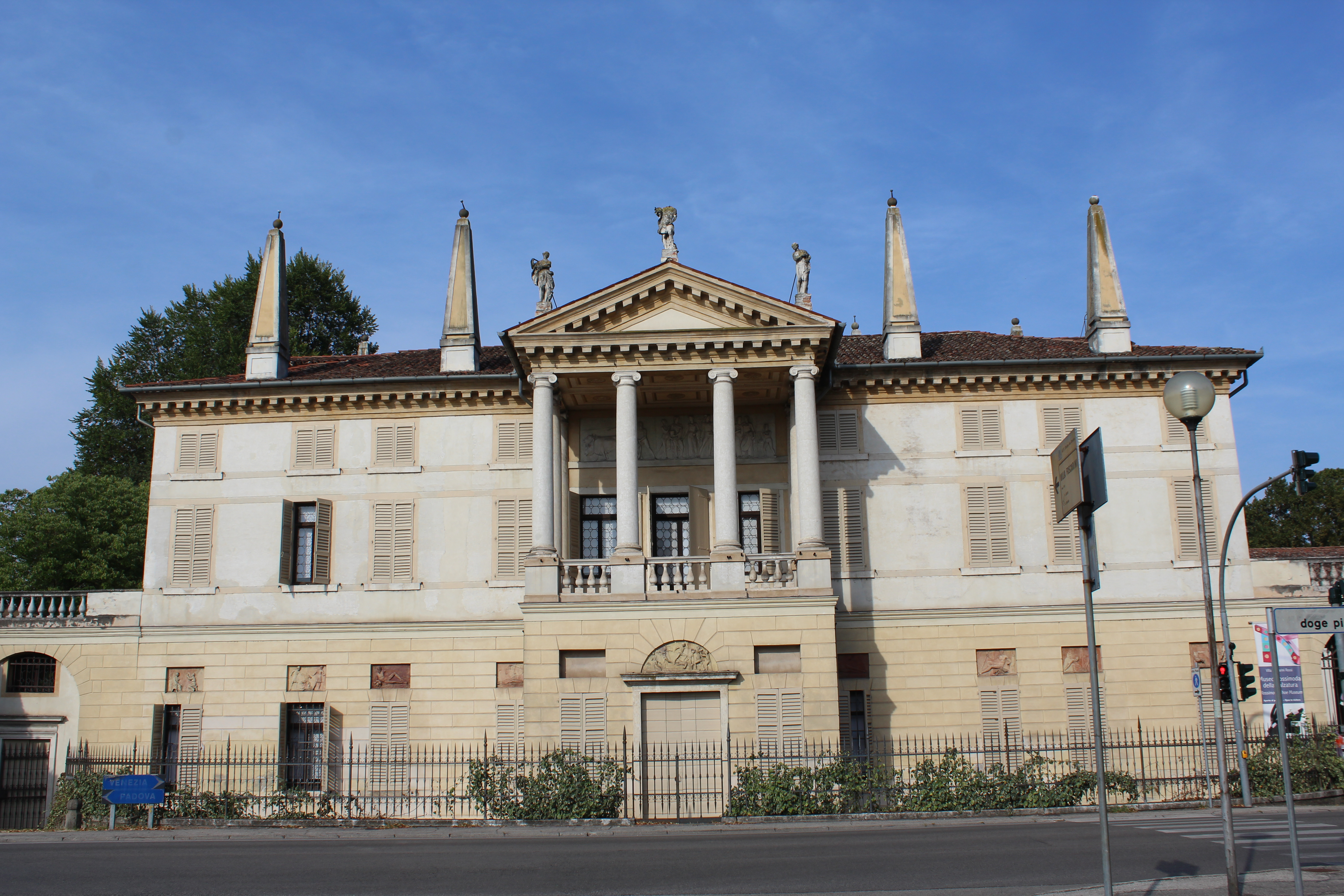
Villa Foscarini Rossi

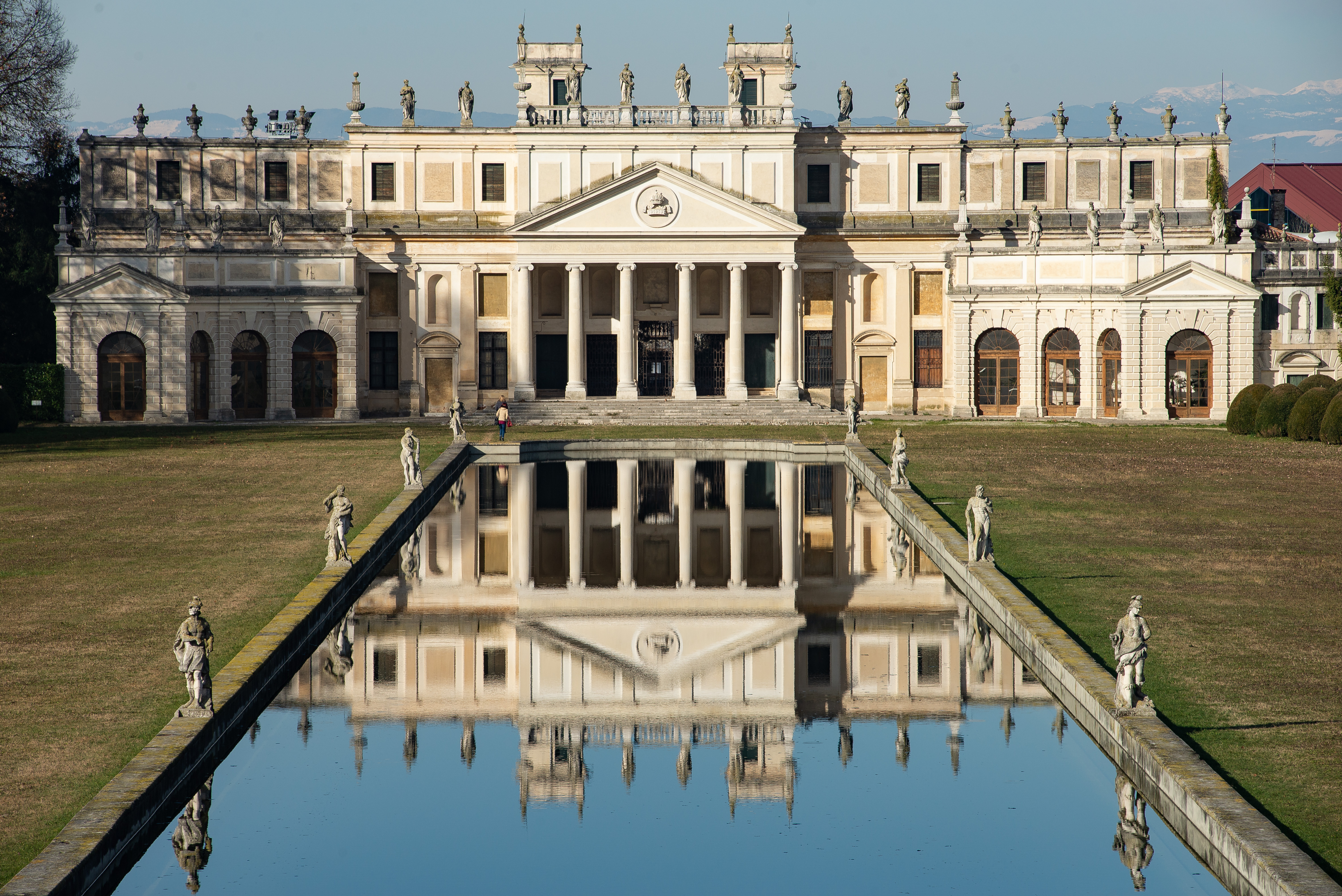
Villa Pisani, Stra

- Villa Alessandri
- Villa Allegri von Ghega, Oriago
- Villa Bon
- Villa Foscari, Malcontenta
- Villa Gradenigo, Oriago
- Palazzo Moro, Oriago
- Villa Priuli, Oriago
- Villa Querini Stampalia, Mira Porte
- Barchesse di villa Valmarana, Mira Porte
- Villa Venier
- Villa Levi Morenos
- Villa Widmann

=== Dolo ===
- Villa Badoer Fattoretto
- Villa Ferretti Angeli
- Villa Fini (destroyed by F4 tornado on July 8th, 2015)
- Villa Gasparini

=== Fiesso d'Artico ===
- Villa Recanati-Zuccon (first half of 18th century)
- Villa Soranzo (16th century)
- Villa Barbarigo-Fontana (first built in 16th century, arranged in 18th century)
- Villa Corner-Vendramin (18th century)
- Villa Contarini di S. Basegio (built between 17th century and 18th century)
- Villa Marchese De Seynos o degli Armeni (17th century)
- Casa Venier-Tiepolo (18th century)

=== Stra ===
- Villa Foscarini Rossi
- Villa Pisani, Stra
- Villa Pisani (San Pietro di Stra)

=== Vigonovo ===
- Villa Sagredo

== See also ==
- Fiesso d'Artico
- Luigi Voltan
