= Villa Pisani, Stra =

Palace near Stra, Italy

National Museum of Villa Pisani
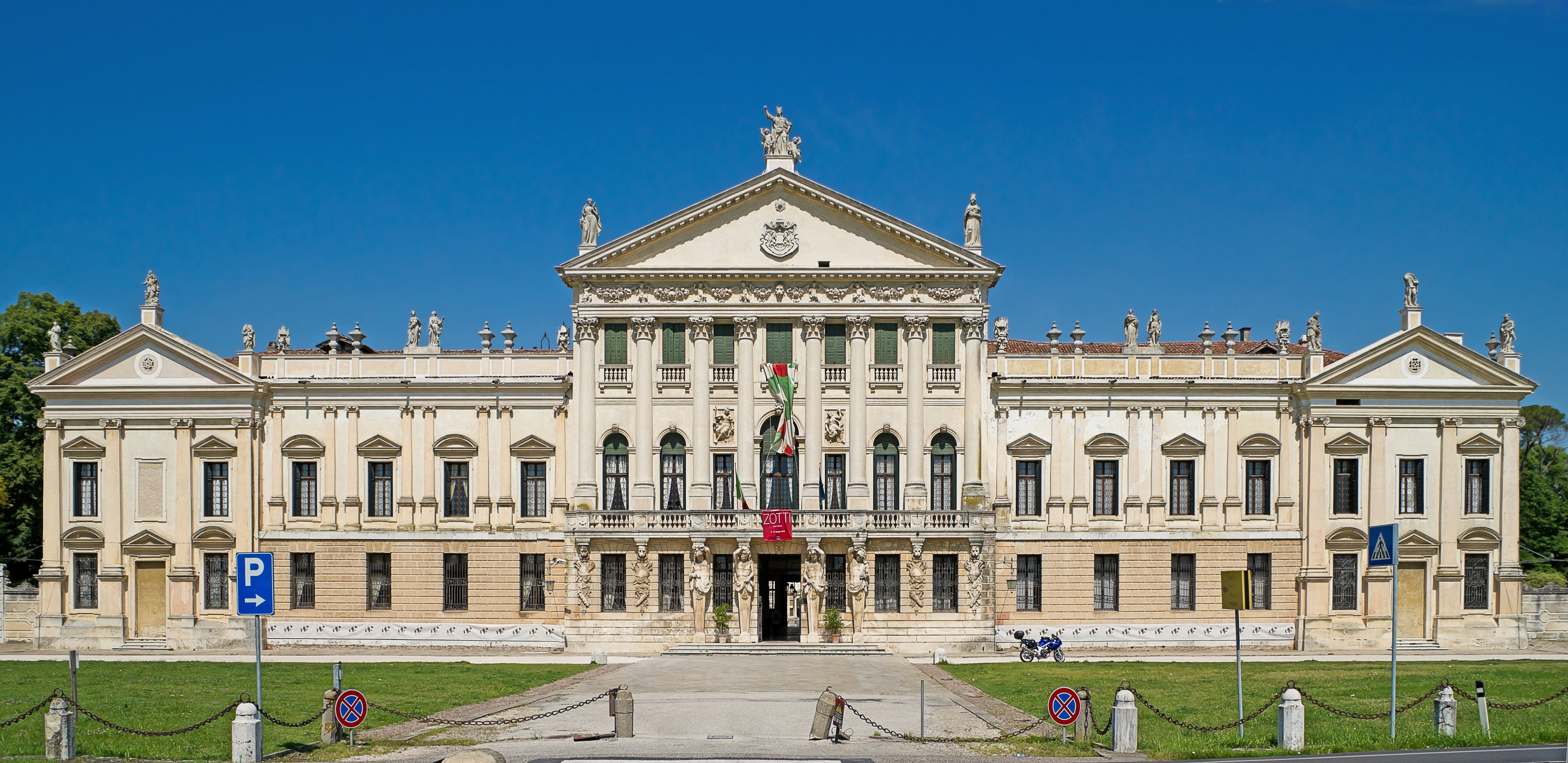
- Location: Via Doge Pisani 7 – 30039 Stra, Venice – Italy
- Coordinates: 45.408503°N 12.012392°E
- Type: Art, architecture, furniture
- Director: Arch. Giuseppe Rallo
- Public transit access: Linea 53E Actv
- Website: villapisani.beniculturali.it

Villa Pisani at Stra refers to the monumental, late-Baroque rural palace located along the Brenta Canal (Riviera del Brenta) at Via Doge Pisani 7 near the town of Stra, on the mainland of the Veneto, northern Italy. This villa is one of the largest examples of Villa Veneta located in the Riviera del Brenta, the canal linking Venice to Padua. The patrician Pisani family of Venice commissioned a number of villas, also known as Villa Pisani across the Venetian mainland. The villa and gardens now operate as a national museum, and the site sponsors art exhibitions.

== History ==
Construction of the palace commenced in the early 18th century for Alvise Pisani, the most prominent member of the Pisani family, who was appointed doge in 1735. The initial models of the palace by Paduan architect Girolamo Frigimelica Roberti still exist, but the design of the main building was ultimately completed by Francesco Maria Preti. When it was completed, the building had 114 rooms, in honour of its owner, the 114th Doge of Venice Alvise Pisani.

In 1807, it was bought by Napoleon from the Pisani family, now in poverty due to great losses in gambling. In 1814, the building became the property of the House of Habsburg who transformed the villa into a place of vacation for the European aristocracy of that period. After 1866 the villa became the property of the House of Savoy, who in 1882 transferred it to the Italian state. In 1934, it was partially restored to host the first meeting of Adolf Hitler and Benito Mussolini.

== Architecture ==
From the outside, the façade of the oversized palace appears to command the site, facing the Brenta River some 30 kilometres (19 mi) from Venice. The villa is one of many along the canal, which the Venetian noble families and merchants started to build as early as the 15th century. The broad façade is topped with statuary, and presents an exuberantly decorated center entrance with monumental columns shouldered by atlantes (an atlas being a male version of a caryatid). It shelters a large complex with two inner courts and acres of gardens, stables, and a garden maze.

The largest room is the ballroom, where the 18th-century painter Giovanni Battista Tiepolo frescoed the two-storey ceiling with a massive allegorical depiction of the Apotheosis or Glory of the Pisani family (painted 1760–1762). Tiepolo's son Gian Domenico Tiepolo, as well as Crostato, Jacopo Guarana, Jacopo Amigoni, P.A. Novelli, and Gaspare Diziani also completed frescoes for various rooms in the villa. Another room of importance in the villa is now known as the "Napoleon Room" (after its occupant), furnished with pieces from the Napoleonic and Habsburg periods and others from when the house was lived in by the Pisani family.

The "most riotously splendid" Tiepolo ceiling would influence his later depiction of the Glory of Spain for the throne room of the Royal Palace of Madrid; however, the grandeur and bombastic ambitions of the ceiling now contrast with the mainly uninhabited shell of a palace. The remainder of its nearly 100 rooms are now empty. The Venetian playwright Carlo Goldoni described the palace in its day as a place of "great fun, served meals, dance and shows".

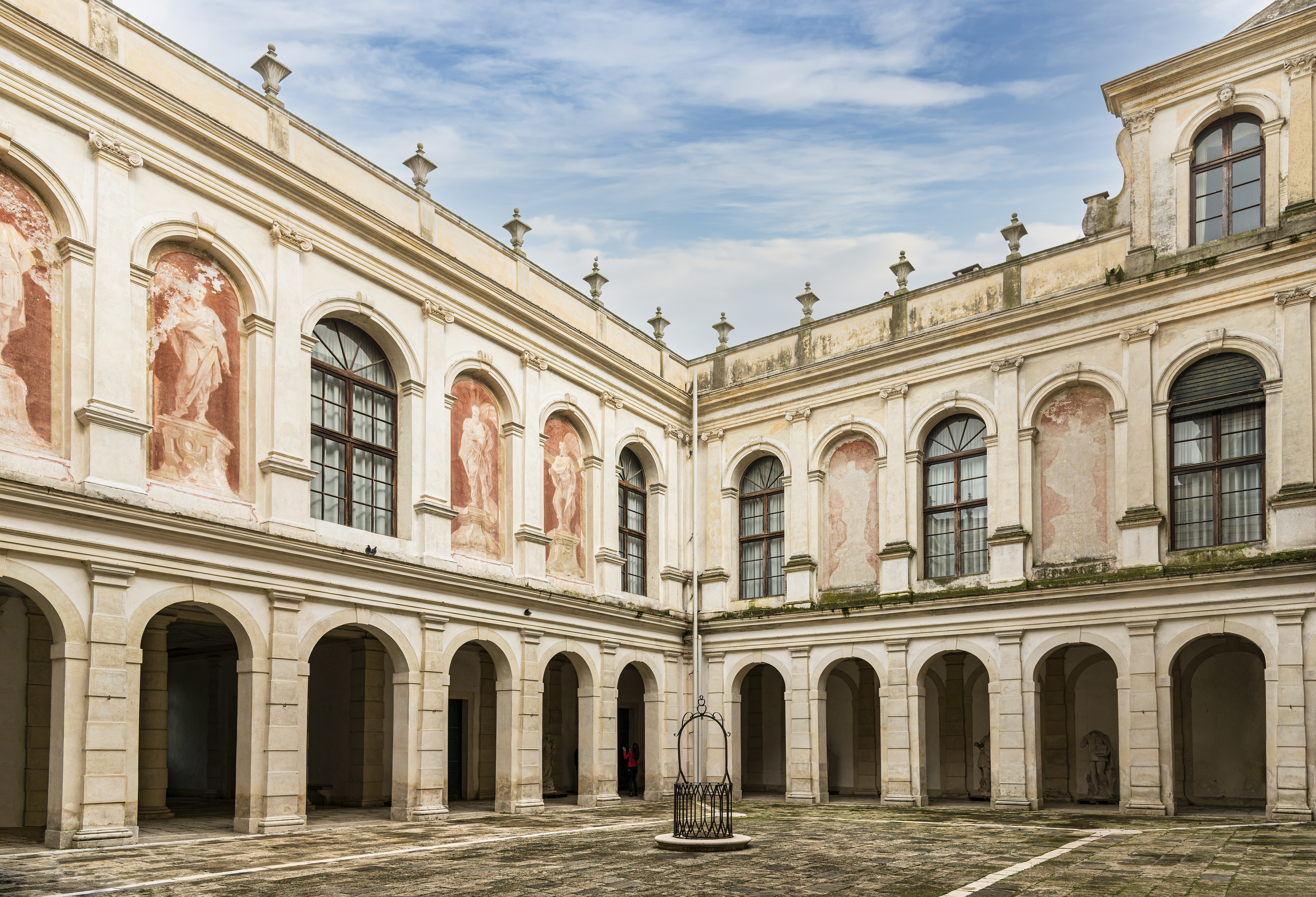
The well in the inner courtyard

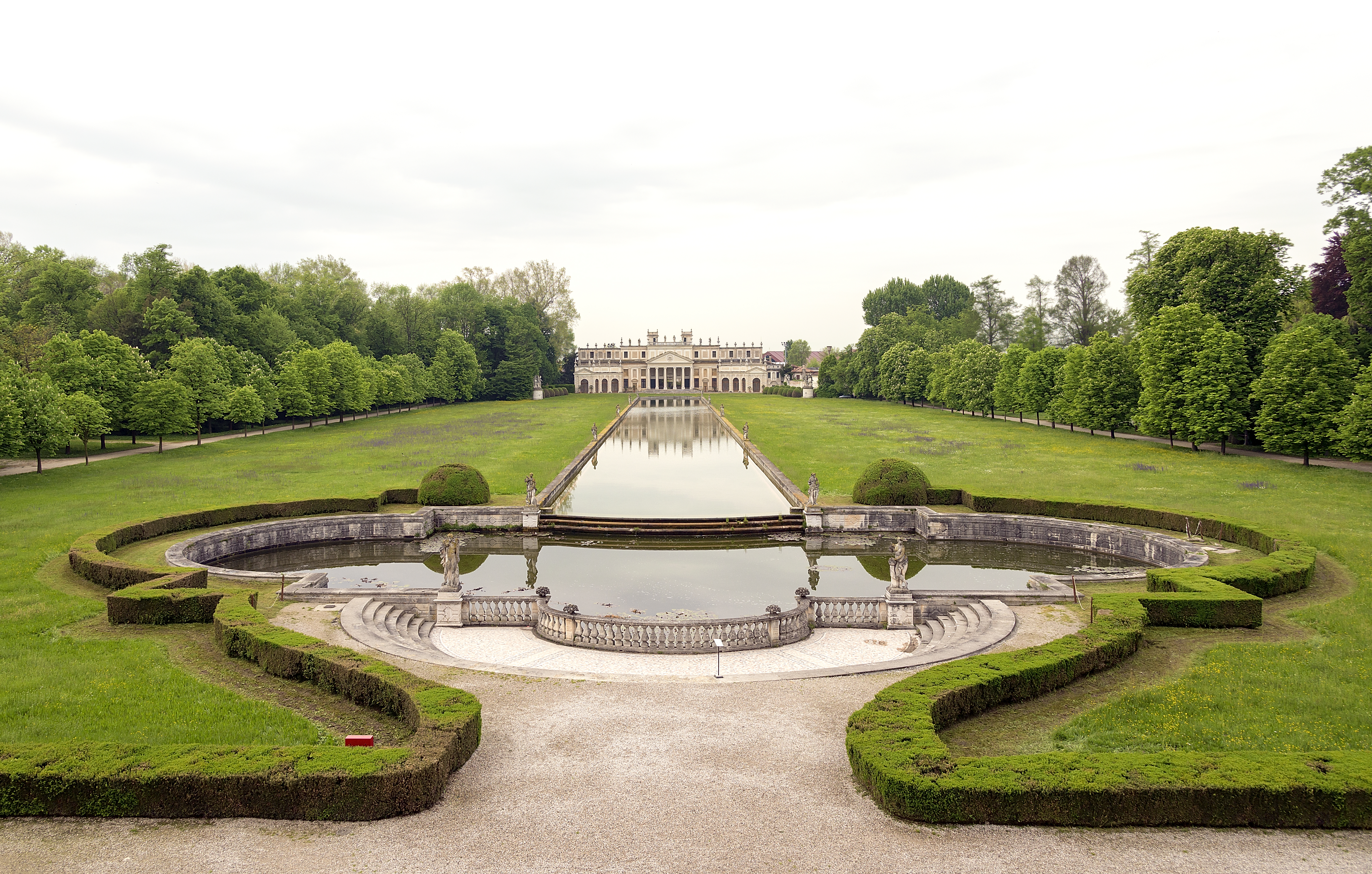
False façade and stables

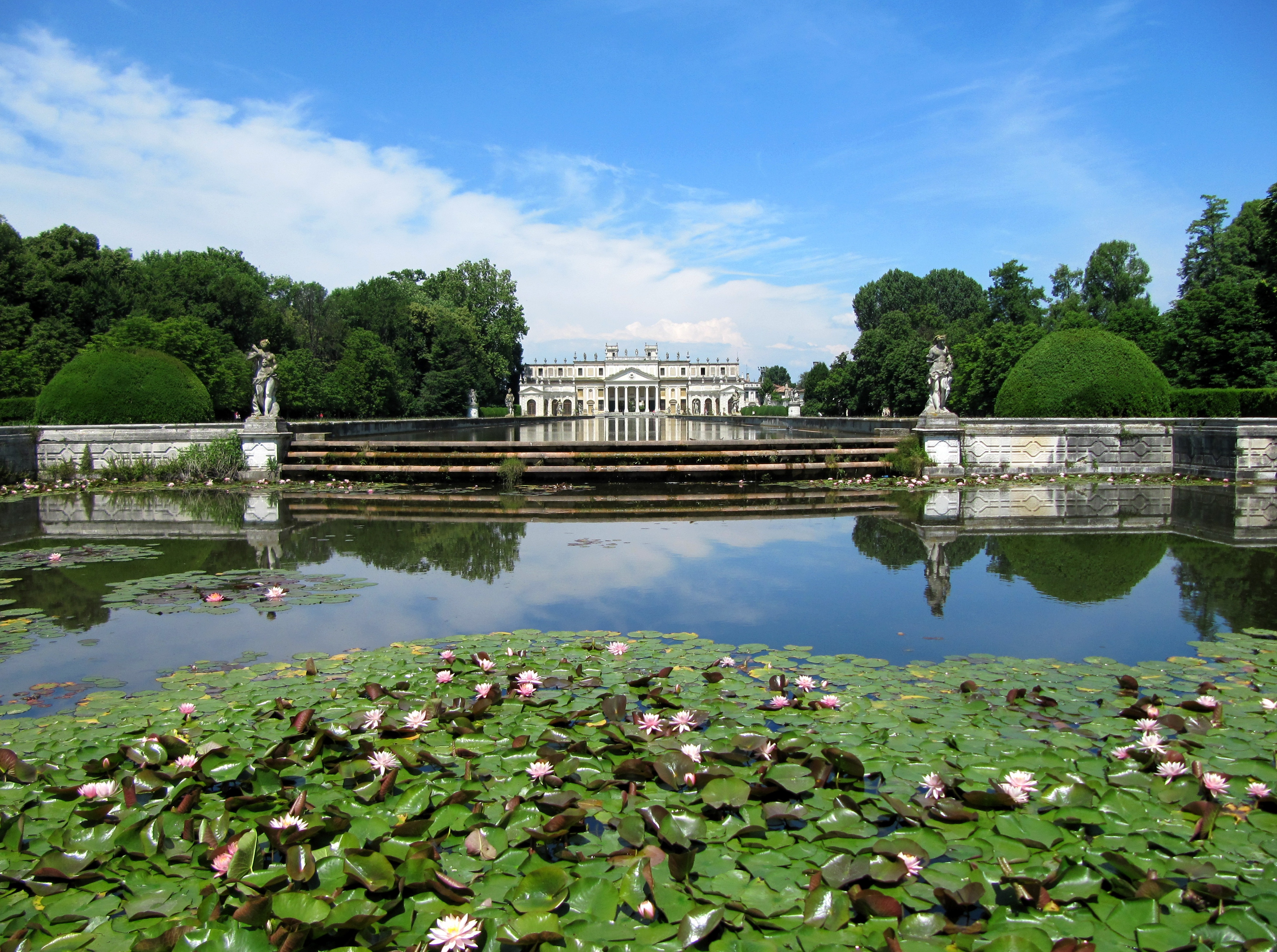
The reflecting pond

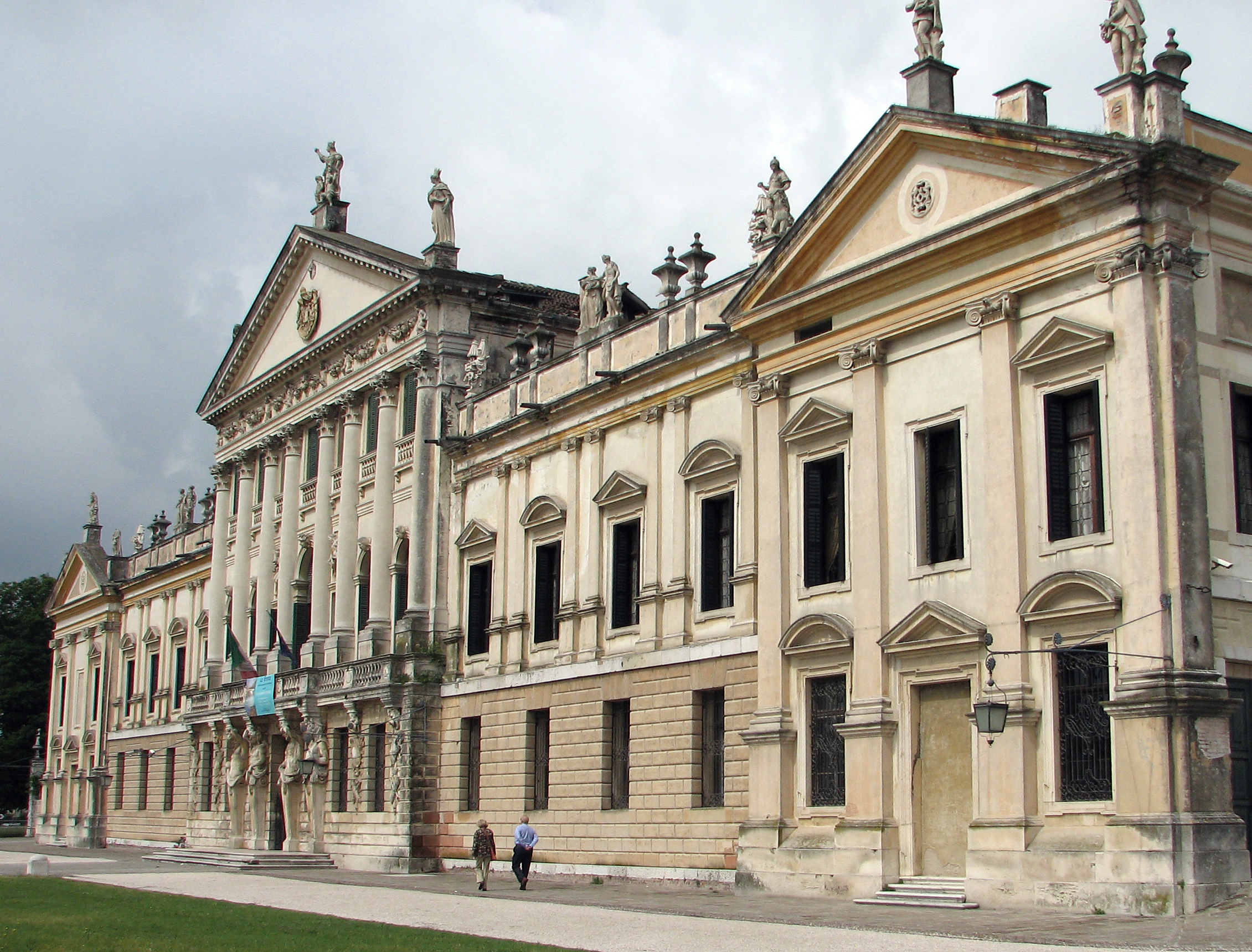
Façade

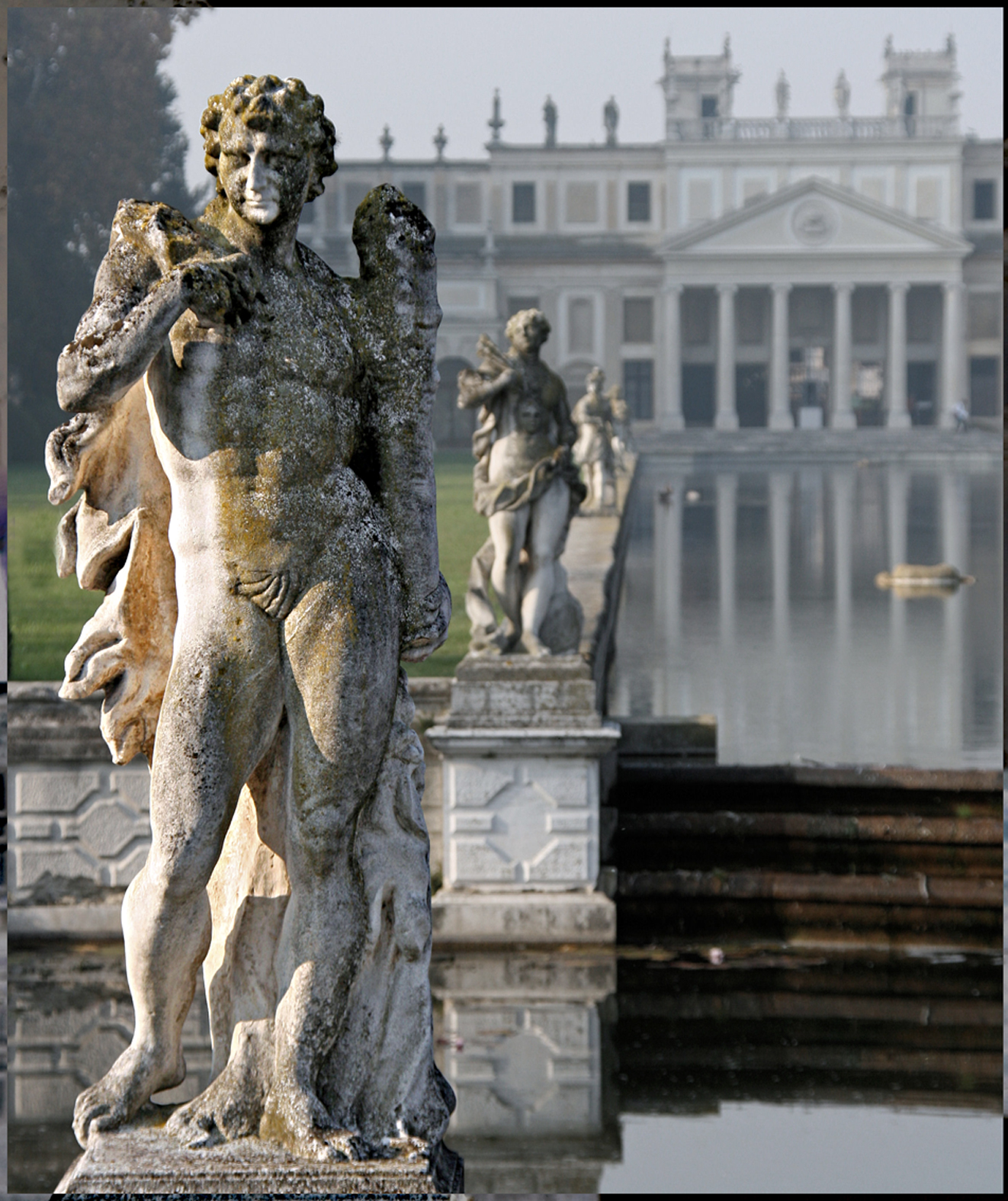
Statuary at Villa Pisani

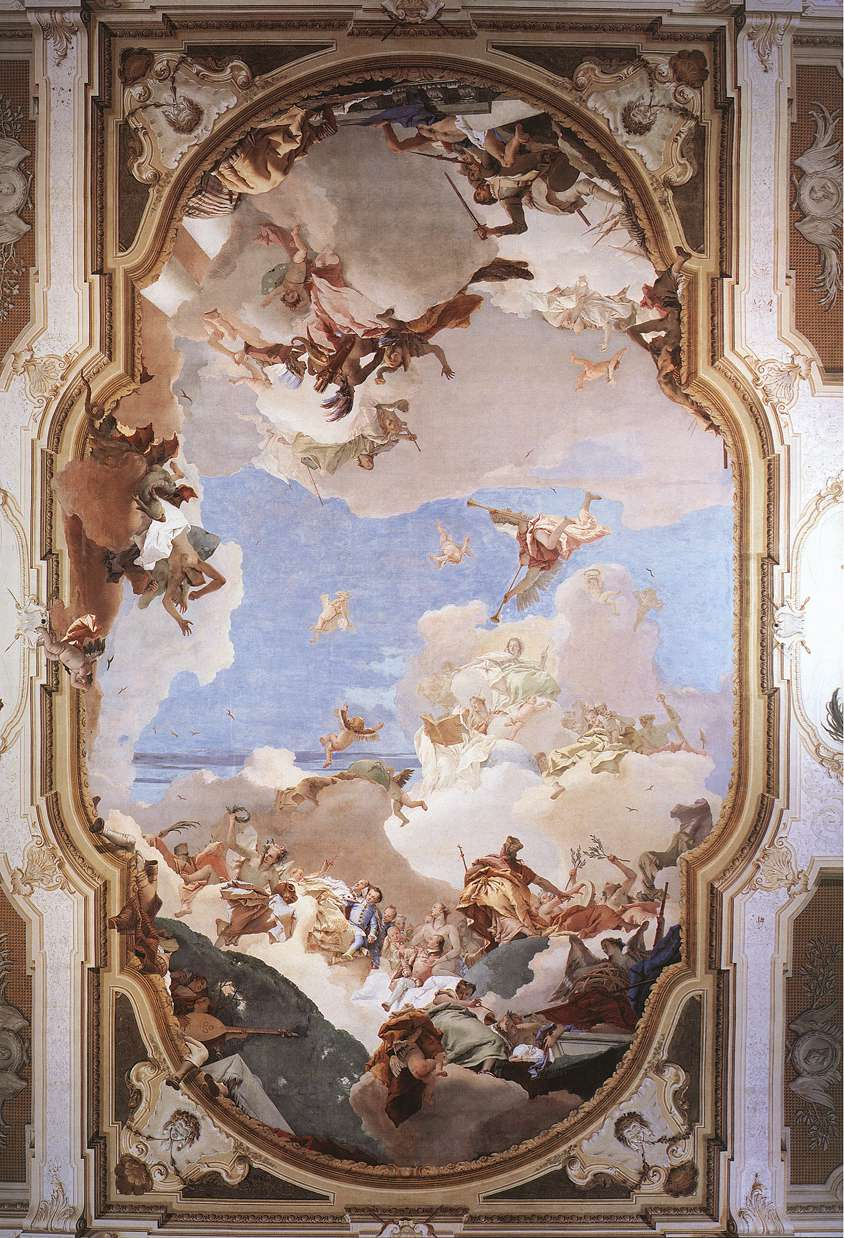
The Apotheosis of the Pisani family

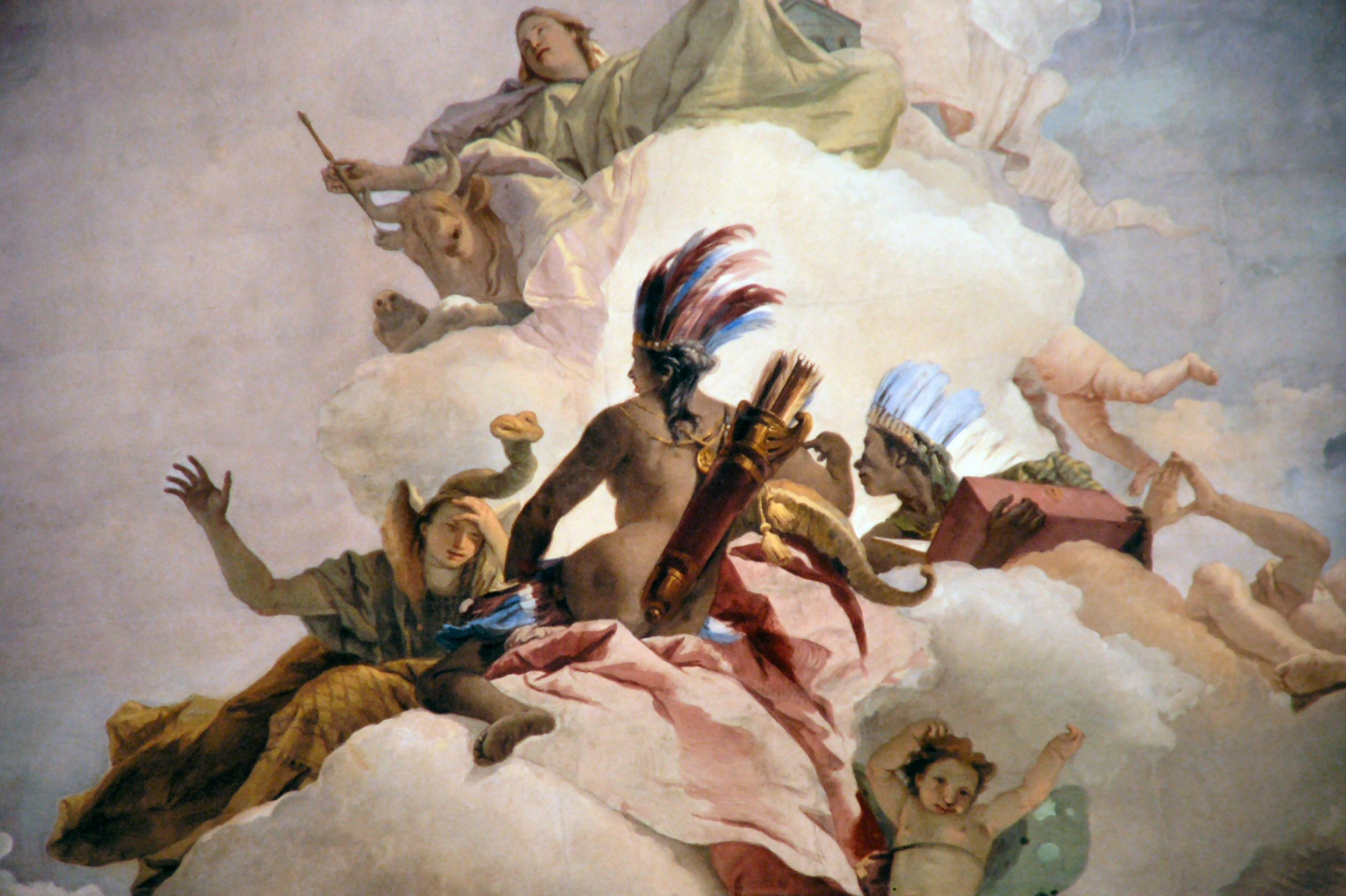
Fresco by Giovanni Battista Tiepolo

== Exhibitions ==
There are often exhibitions of ancient, modern and contemporary art. The halls host 150,000 visitors a year. In 2007, the villa hosted the exhibitions "I classici del contemporaneo" and "Extradimensionism" by Paolo Aldighieri. In 2008, there was an important exhibition by Mimmo Paladino, followed in 2009 by "Impressionismo a Venezia, 1879–1933" by Emma Ciardi. In 2011, "Tutto score" by Oliviero Rainaldi was held at the villa.

== See also ==
- List of Baroque residences
- Palladian Villas of the Veneto
- Riviera del Brenta (The Brenta river)
