= Villa Foscari =

Villa in Mira, Italy

UNESCO World Heritage Site
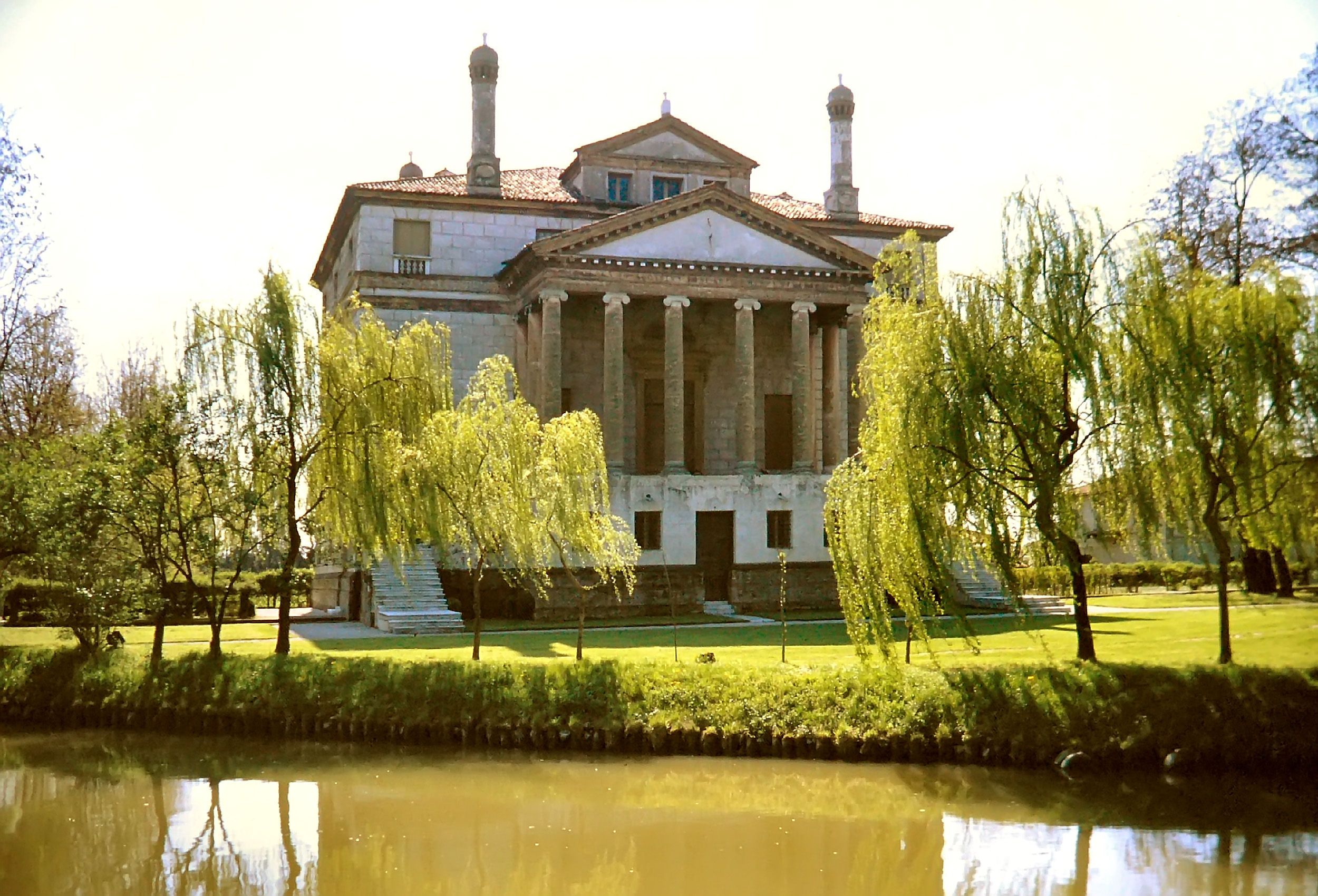

- Location within Veneto Location within Italy
- Location: Mira, Venice, Veneto, Italy
- Part of: City of Vicenza and the Palladian Villas of the Veneto
- Criteria: Cultural: (i), (ii)
- Reference: 712bis-021
- Inscription: 1994 (18th Session)
- Extensions: 1996
- Area: 5.87 ha (14.5 acres)
- Website: www.lamalcontenta.com
- Coordinates: 45°26′7″N 12°12′4″E

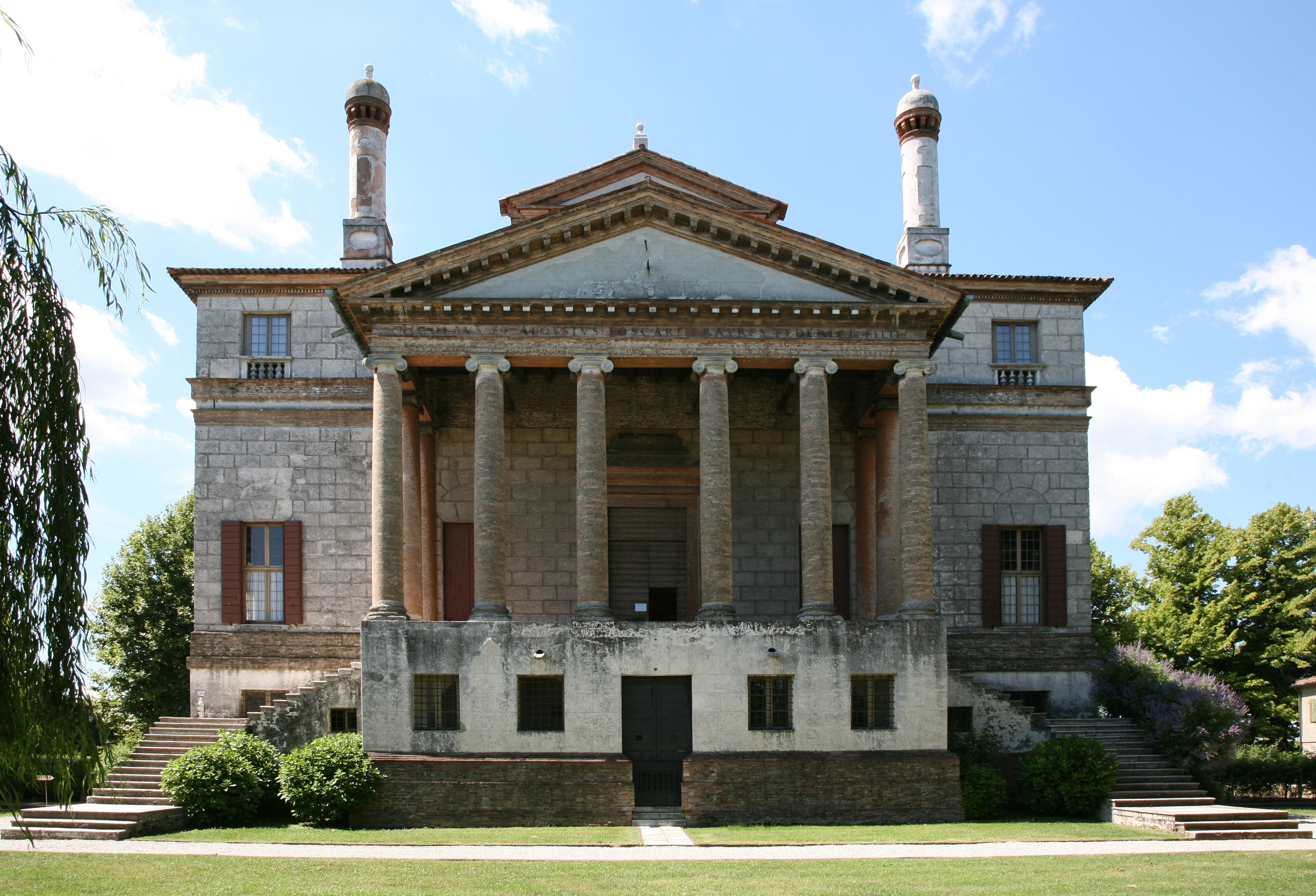
Villa Foscari: facing the Brenta

Villa Foscari is a villa in Mira, near Venice, northern Italy, designed by the Italian Renaissance architect Andrea Palladio. The home was constructed by Palladio for two patrician brothers. It was built in the mid 1550s. It is also known as La Malcontenta ("The Discontented"), a nickname which—according to a legend—it received when the spouse of one of the Foscaris was locked up in the house because she allegedly did not live up to her conjugal duty.

== Architecture ==
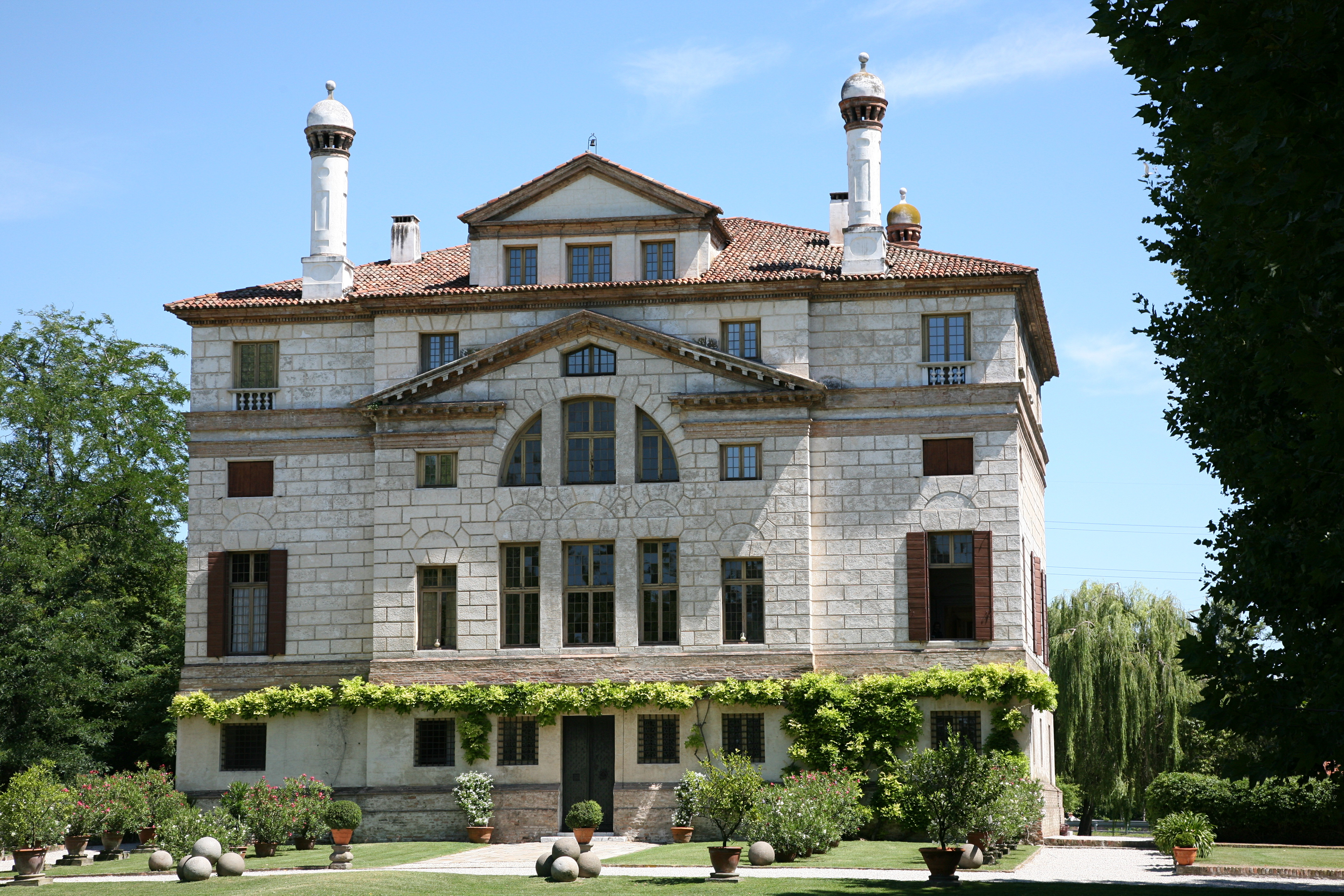
Villa Foscari: rear façade

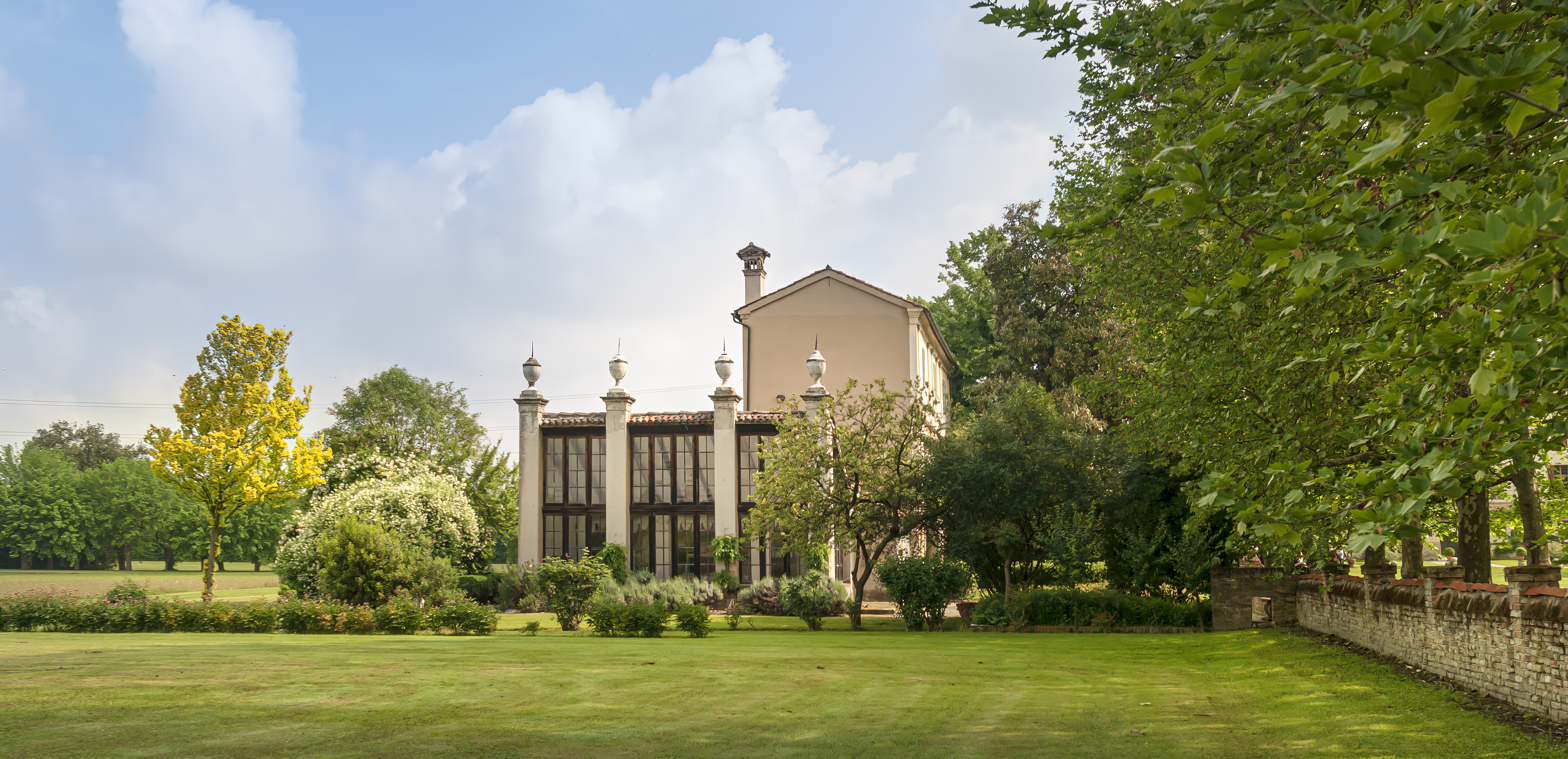
The greenhouse of Villa Foscari

The villa was commissioned by the brothers Nicolò and Alvise (Luigi) Foscari, members of a very famous patrician Venetian family. They are the descendants of Francesco Foscari, one of Venice's most controversial and longest reigning doges. It was built between 1558 and 1560. It is located beside the Brenta canal and is raised on a pedestal, which is characteristic of Palladio's villas. This pedestal is more massive than most of Palladio's villas. The base is 11 feet (3.4 m) high, more than twice the height Palladio normally used, because it was not possible to construct a subterranean basement on the site.

Villa Foscari lacks the agricultural buildings which were an integral part of some of the other Palladian villas. Foscari was as much of a suburban residence as it was a farmhouse. Palladio knew that his patrons were very wealthy, high status men. Thus, this villa catered more towards hosting than others Palladio designed. Visitors would ascend a ceremonial pathway to the portico, where their host would be waiting. The villa was, indeed, used for official receptions. The most notable was for Henry III of France in 1574. The house is, indeed, quite famous. It has been proposed that the villa was the home of Portia called Belmont in The Merchant of Venice.

Foscari's façade is in usual style of Palladio, and contains three stories with heavy symmetry. It also features many Roman elements such as a portico, large columns, a triangular pediment, and an emphasis on verticality. The façade is largely thought to be inspired by a temple on the Clitumno river. Strong, bright windows seem to pierce through the stone walls. These thermal windows inspired the ones used on the façade of Villa Toeplitz, another famous Italian home.

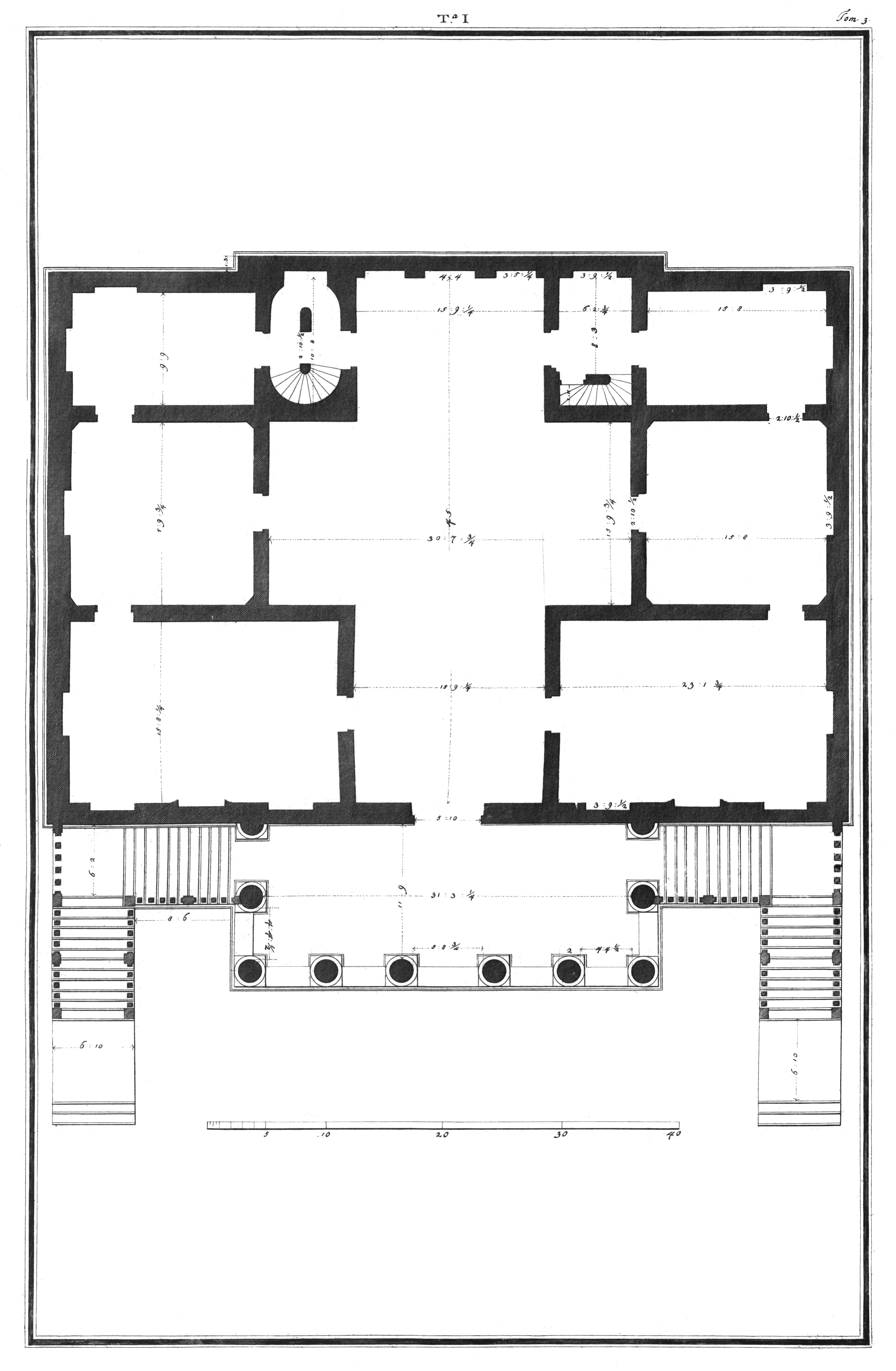
Plan, drawn by Ottavio Bertotti Scamozzi, 1781

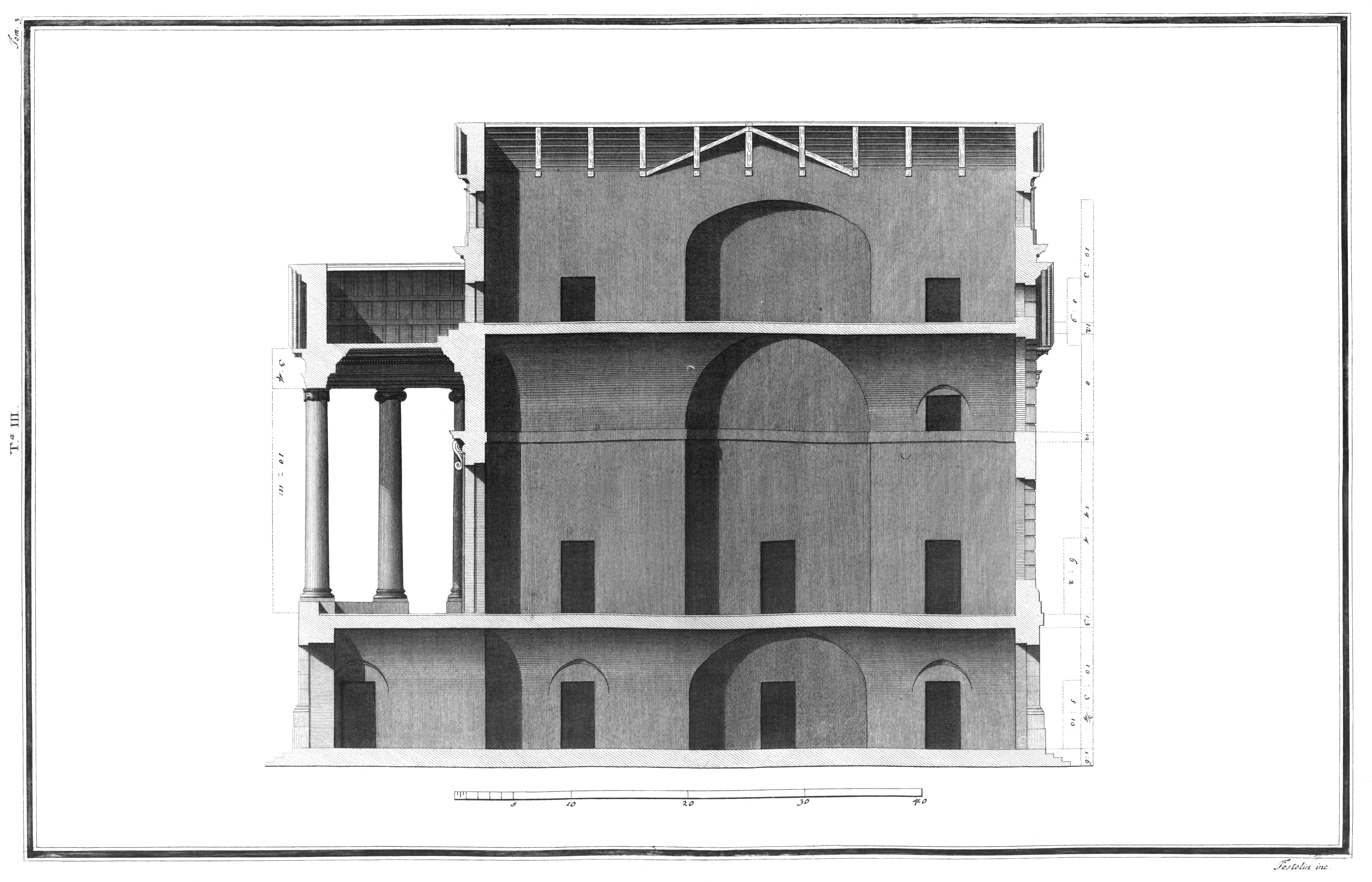
Cross section (Ottavio Bertotti Scamozzi, 1781)

Villa Foscari did not always stand alone on the property. Throughout the years, there have been many additions to the home. More porticoes were added at the end of the seventeenth century. These porticoes bore the weight of second floor patios. In the eighteenth century, both a guest home and a chapel were added; however, in the 1810s the home was sold. The buyers proceeded to dismantle these additions and sell the scraps. This resulted in the once again secluded villa that exists today.

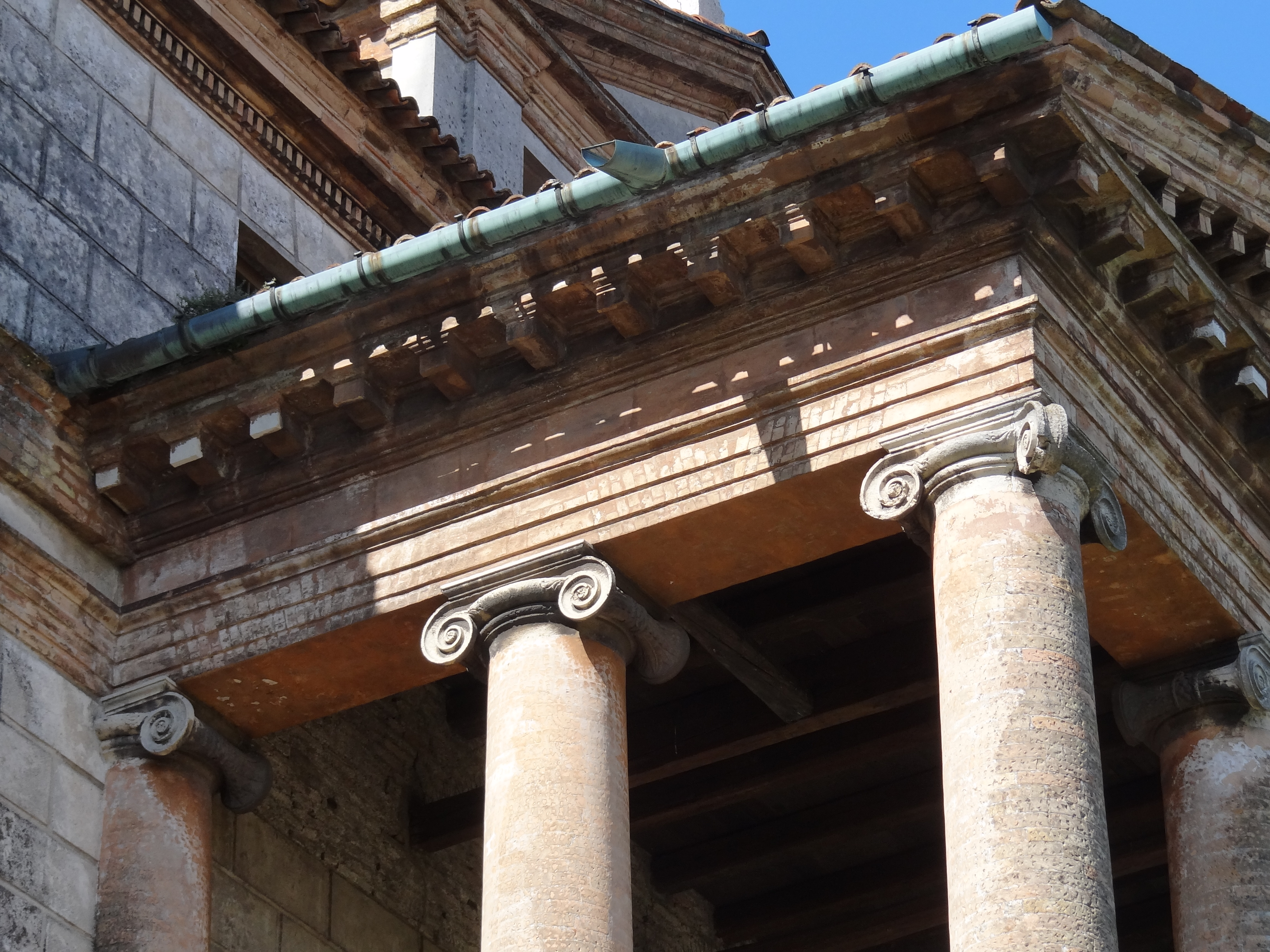
Columns supporting the portico

== Interior ==
The interior of the villa is divided into two symmetrical apartments to suite the brothers for which it was made. Each apartment is composed of three rooms. The largest room faces north to keep cool in the summer, another faces south to stay warm, and the third adjoins them as a hosting space. This further emphasizes Palladio's belief that every space should serve one specific purpose.

Inside the home, all the walls and vaults are richly decorated with frescoes. Palladio himself did not like for his designs to have this much ornamentation; thus, when the home was under his jurisdiction, only the walls of the central room were painted. The rest of the frescoes were added by the brothers later on. They were done by Battista Franco and Giambattista Zelotti. Mythological scenes from Ovid alternate with allegories of the Arts and Virtues. As at other Palladian villas, the paintings reflect villa life, for example, Astraea showing Jove the pleasures of the Earth. The frescoes were covered with lime wash in the 1810s, a travesty that was not completely undone until the 1970s. Since they were painted, the frescoes have also dulled over time, signs of the increasing threat that air pollution poses to works of art.

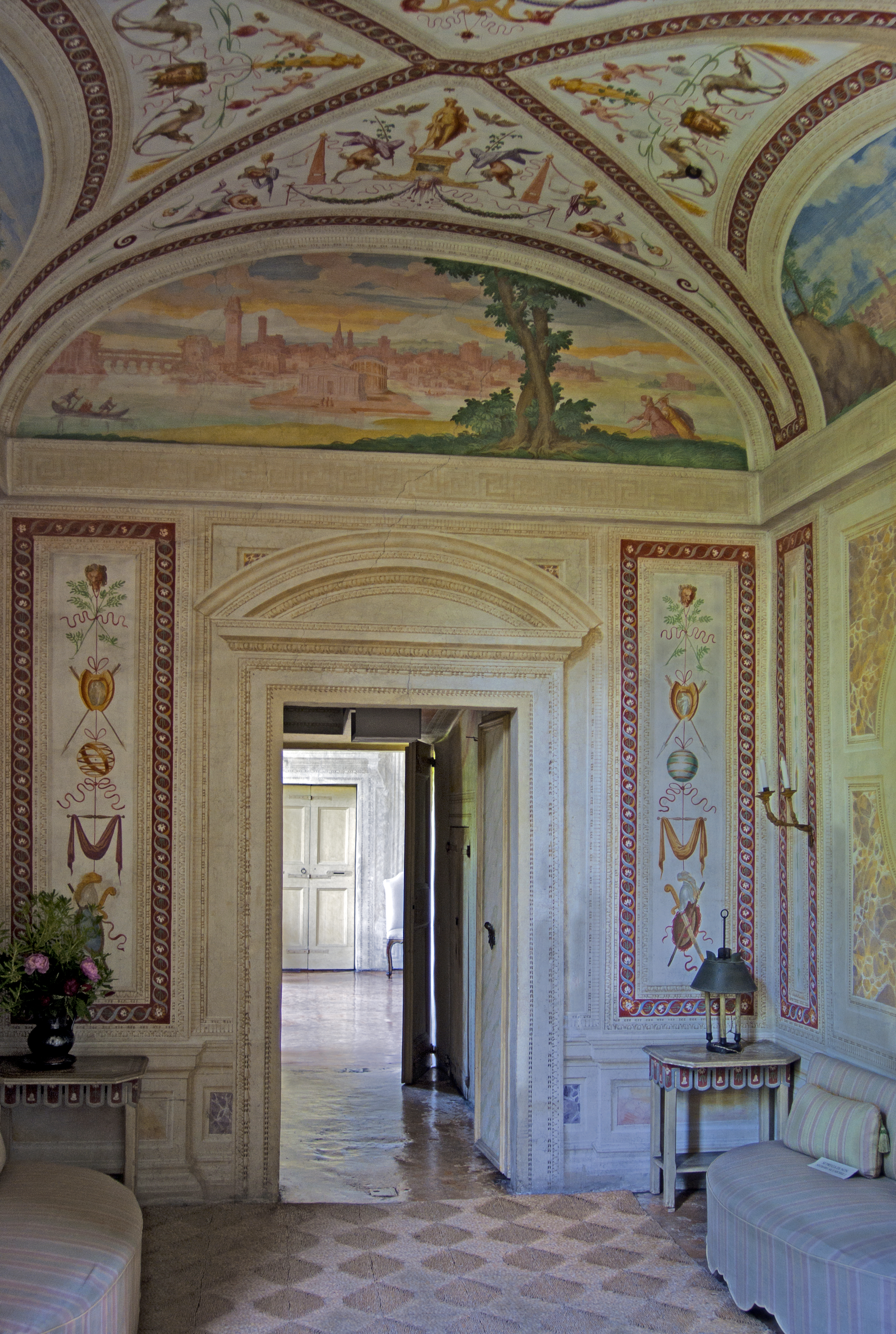
Trompe-l'œil and grotesque

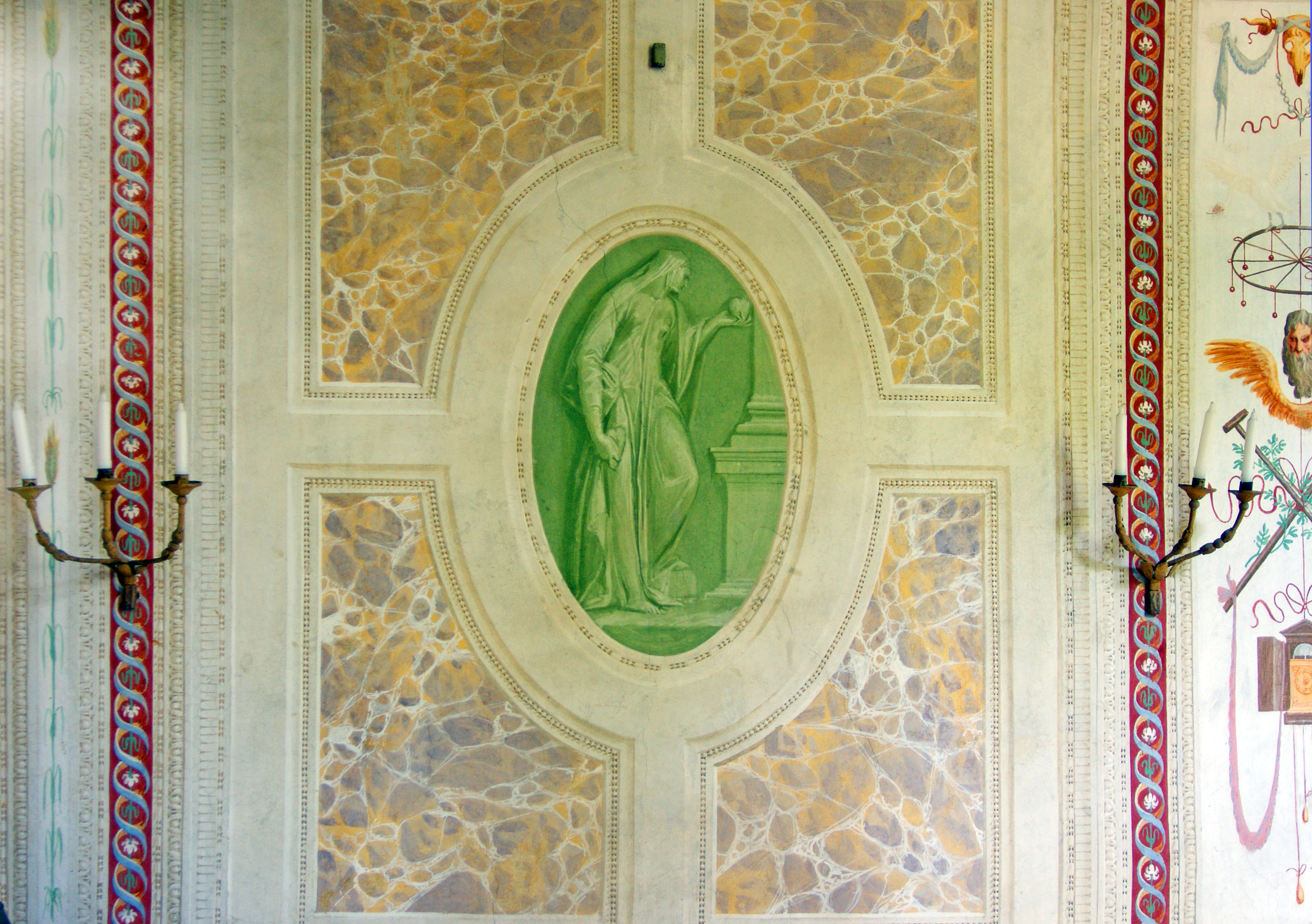
Trompe-l'œil and grotesque

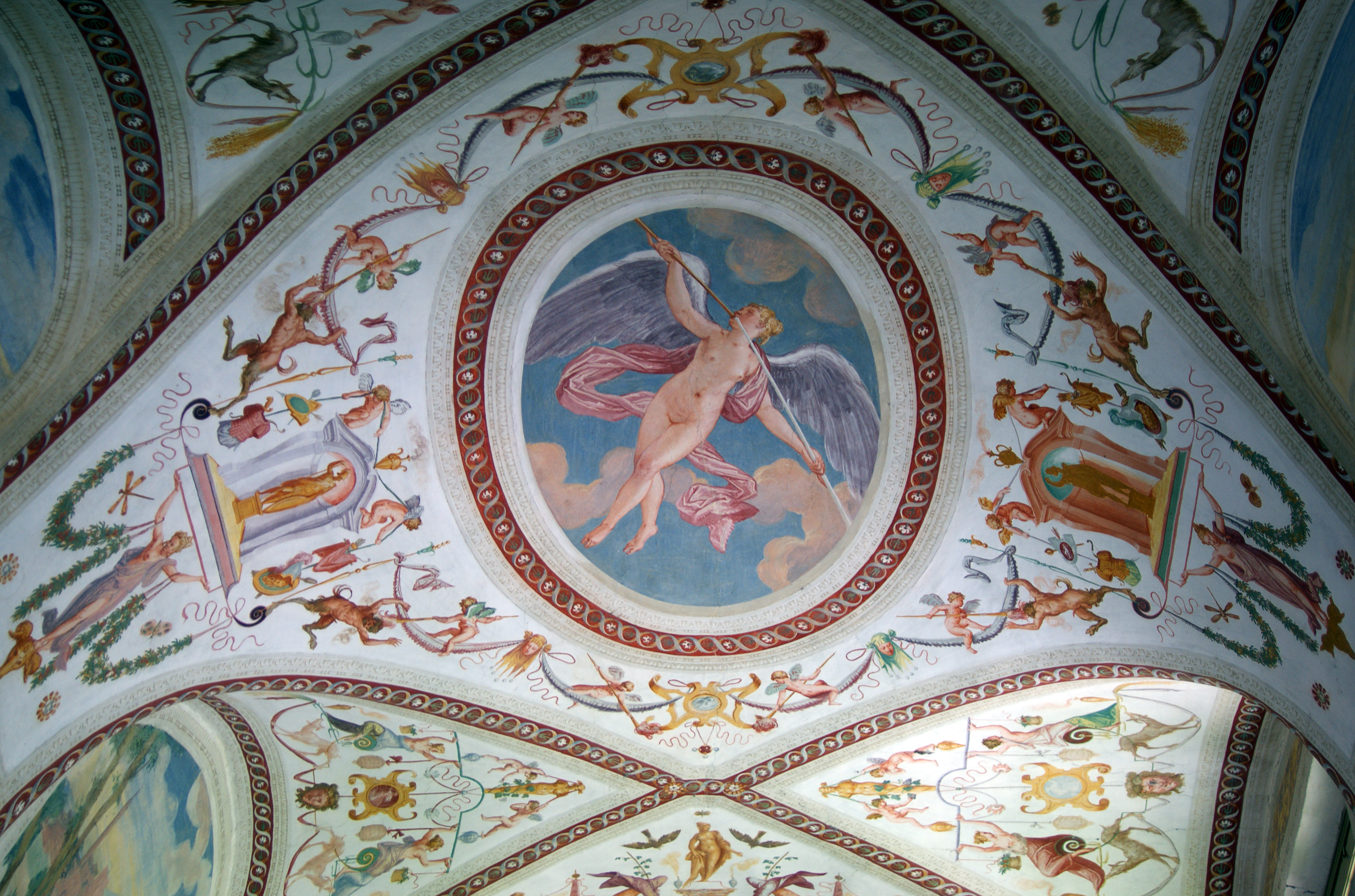
Plafond and grotesque

== Recent history ==
The British travel writer Robert Byron visited the villa in 1933 and afterwards wrote that bon vivant Albert Clinton Landsberg had, nine years earlier, found the villa "at the point of ruin, doorless and windowless, a granary of indeterminate farm-produce. He has made it a habitable dwelling. The proportion of the great hall and state rooms are a mathematical paean." The villa had indeed been vacated in the early 19th century, the surrounding stables and other buildings had fallen apart and were demolished by Austrian troops during the 1848 uprisings. At the end of the 19th century however, banker Baron Frédéric Emile d'Erlanger, based in Paris and London, had found the house in the above described condition, then leased the villa from the Foscari family, and undertook some renovation work. Bertie Landsberg had purchased the villa in 1926, together with his friends Paul Rodocanachi and Catherine, Baroness d'Erlanger, the daughter-in-law of the former tenant. The new owners renovated the house and gardens and invited members of the high-society to lavish salons during summer seasons: impresario Sergei Diaghilev, dancers Boris Kochno and Serge Lifar, writer Paul Morand, architect Le Corbusier, Winston Churchill, among others. Bertie Landsberg, issue of an originally Jewish banking family, as the Erlangers, fled the Italian Fascists in 1939 and only returned to the villa in 1947. Kate d'Erlanger moved to Beverly Hills. In 1965, the English architect Claud Phillimore, 4th Baron Phillimore (1911–1994) inherited the villa from Landsberg. He began restoration, but sold the house in 1973 to count Antonio ("Tonci") Foscari (b. 1938), a descendant of the former owners and professor for architecture and preservation. He and his wife, Barbara del Vicario, undertook a painstaking process of restoring it to its original grandeur. In 2012, Foscari wrote of the villa's renaissance.

Since 1996 the building has been conserved as part of the World Heritage Site "City of Vicenza and the Palladian Villas of the Veneto". Today, the villa is open to the public for visits on a limited basis.

== See also ==
- Ca' Foscari
- Palladian Villas of the Veneto
- Palladian architecture
