= Saint-Marcellin, Isère =

Saint-Marcellin
- Commune
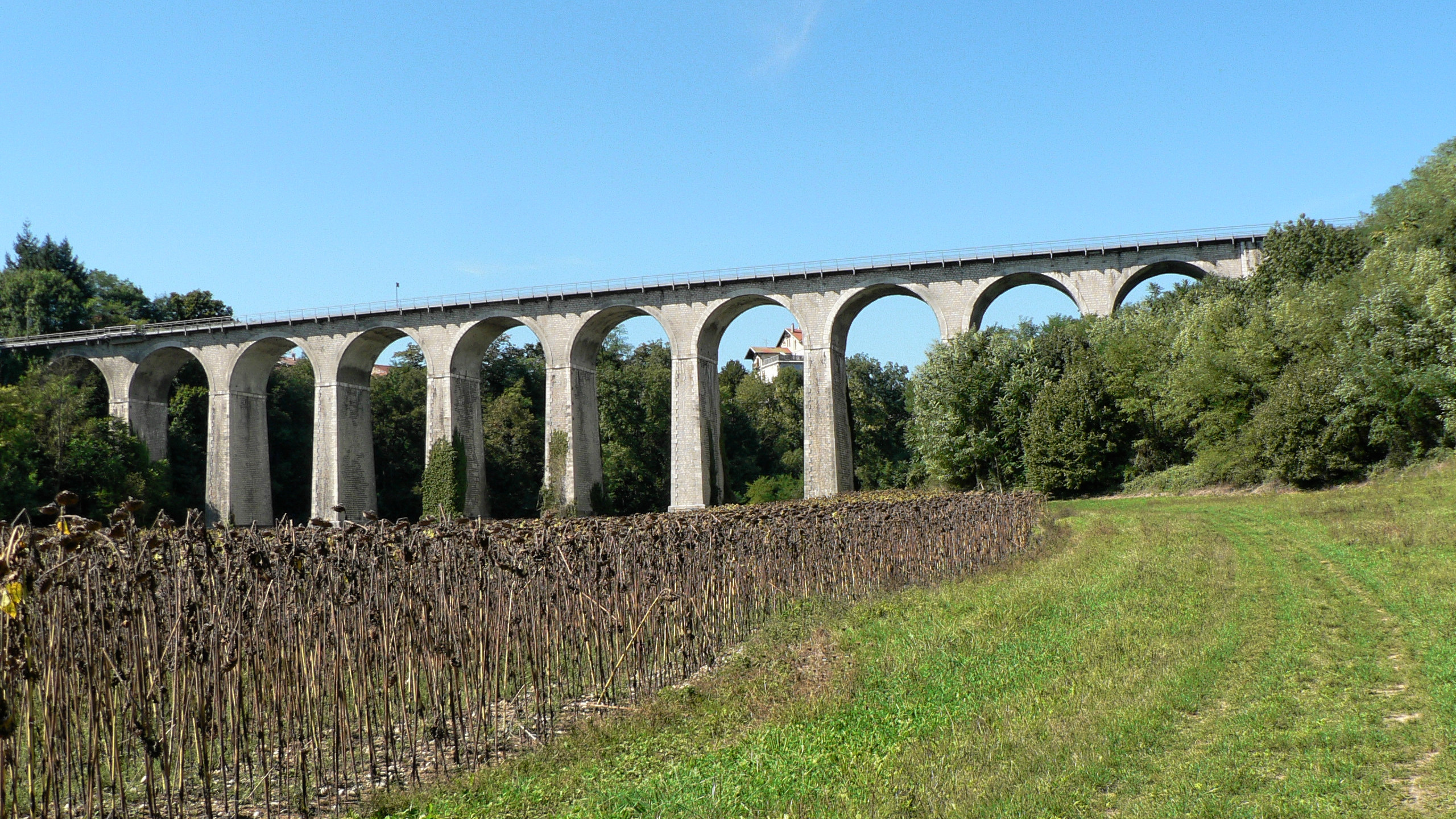
- Railroad viaduct

- Coat of arms
- Location of Saint-Marcellin
- Location within France Location within Auvergne-Rhône-Alpes
- Coordinates: 45°09′14″N 5°19′14″E
- Country: France
- Region: Auvergne-Rhône-Alpes
- Department: Isère
- Arrondissement: Grenoble
- Canton: Le Sud Grésivaudan
- Intercommunality: Saint-Marcellin Vercors Isère

Government
  - Mayor (2020–2026): Raphaël Mocellin
- Area^{1}: 7.81 km^{2} (3.02 sq mi)
- Highest elevation: 300 m (980 ft)
- Lowest elevation: 275 m (902 ft)
- Population (2023): 7,700
  - Density: 990/km^{2} (2,600/sq mi)
- Time zone: UTC+01:00 (CET)
  - Summer (DST): UTC+02:00 (CEST)
- INSEE/Postal code: 38416 /38160
- ^{1} French Land Register data, which excludes lakes, ponds, glaciers > 1 km^{2} (0.386 sq mi or 247 acres) and river estuaries.

Saint-Marcellin (French pronunciation: [sɛ̃ maʁsəlɛ̃]) is a commune in the Isère department, in southeastern France, 51 km from Grenoble.

The town is served by a railway station, on the line from Valence to Grenoble.

== Population ==
Historical population

Year	Pop.	±% p.a.
1793	3,013	—
1800	3,047	+0.16%
1806	3,215	+0.90%
1821	2,780	−0.96%
1831	3,191	+1.39%
1836	2,885	−2.00%
1841	3,116	+1.55%
1846	3,408	+1.81%
1851	3,460	+0.30%
1856	3,459	−0.01%
1861	3,295	−0.97%
1866	3,173	−0.75%
1872	3,340	+0.86%
1876	3,307	−0.25%
1881	3,250	−0.35%
1886	3,393	+0.86%
1891	3,392	−0.01%
1896	3,308	−0.50%
1901	3,237	−0.43%

Year	Pop.	±% p.a.
1906	3,305	+0.42%
1911	3,348	+0.26%
1921	3,312	−0.11%
1926	3,764	+2.59%
1931	3,995	+1.20%
1936	4,258	+1.28%
1946	4,308	+0.12%
1954	4,486	+0.51%
1962	5,298	+2.10%
1968	6,186	+2.62%
1975	6,779	+1.32%
1982	6,795	+0.03%
1990	6,696	−0.18%
1999	6,955	+0.42%
2007	7,794	+1.43%
2012	8,075	+0.71%
2017	7,903	−0.43%
2023	7,700	−0.43%

Source: EHESS and INSEE (1968-2023)

== Twin towns ==
Saint-Marcellin is twinned with:

- Grafing, Germany, since 1994
- Fiesso d'Artico, Italy, since 2007

== See also ==
- Communes of the Isère department
- Parc naturel régional du Vercors
