= Luigi Voltan =

Calzaturificio Voltan
- Industry: Apparel
- Founded: 1898; 128 years ago in Stra, Italy
- Founder: Giovanni Luigi Voltan

The Calzaturificio Voltan is a Footwear manufacturer founded in the Italian village of Stra in 1898 by Giovanni Luigi Voltan (1873–1941).

After returning to Italy from the United States, Voltan introduced serialized production process for his factory. The mechanization of some phases of the cycle allowed him to cut costs, which lowered the price for consumers. The quick growth of the Voltan footwear factory became the basis for the development of the Riviera del Brenta footwear district.

== Background ==
In 1898, Stra was a little country village of the Venetian hinterland that was affected, like many others, by the agricultural crisis. As emigration seemed to be the only alternative to unemployment, Voltan left the country for Boston in the United States. At that time, shoe manufacturing was a significant industry in Boston. The U.S. footwear production was very much industrialized; it was characterized by division of the production cycle, and mechanization of the manufacturing phases. Voltan was hired by large companies and worked in different departments. He mastered the serialized production process, concluding that these techniques should be used in Italy.

== Production ==
Returning to Stra gave Voltan many advantages over more traditional Italian shoe makers who were still bound to manual production. Sewing machines for leather and hides marketed by the Singer Corporation were beginning to spread throughout Italy, but these machines were too simple for mass production. The few shoe factories in existence at that time were extensions of craft shops rather than production lines.

Voltan started a workshop in his native village, using American and German machinery. In 1904, he employed between 400 and 500 workers, producing 1,000 shoes a day. The mechanization of some phases of the cycle allowed him to cut costs, which lowered the price for consumers. It was a strategic choice. He created his own retail sales network so that he could sell directly to consumers and thus undercut his competitors. He opened shops throughout Italy prior to the First World War. After Giovanni Luigi, his son Emanuele ran the company, as well as his nephew Giovanni, together with his two sons Emanuele and Marco.

The quick growth of the Voltan footwear factory was an example for others, and it was the basis for the development of the Riviera del Brenta footwear district. Thus, the Voltan factory became the catalyst for one of many new industries in Italy during that period.

== Currently ==
Currently, the historic footwear company has been carrying on, for generations, the shoe line named Voltan dal 1898. The company aims to preserve the history, expertise, and craftsmanship that define the identity of the Voltan brand. The collection is dedicated to women’s footwear and represents a style based on class, elegance, and the tradition of Made in Italy.

== See also ==
- Sergio Rossi
