= Mira, Veneto =

Mira
- Comune
- Comune di Mira
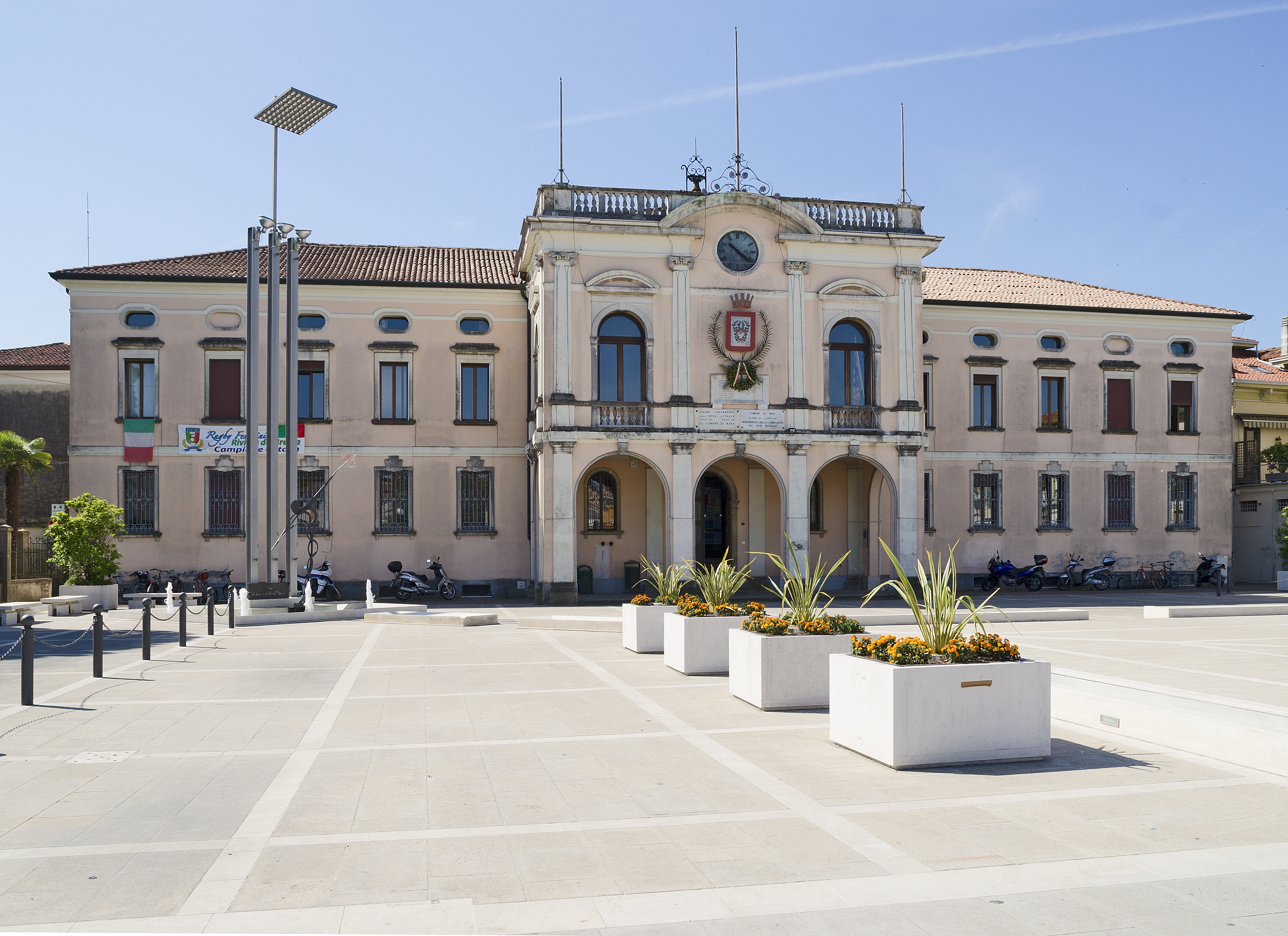
- Town Hall of Mira

- Location within Italy Location within Veneto
- Coordinates: 45°26′N 12°08′E
- Country: Italy
- Region: Veneto
- Metropolitan city: Venice (VE)
- Frazioni: Borbiago, Gambarare, Malcontenta, Marano Veneziano, Mira Porte, Mira Taglio, Oriago Località: Ca' Argentina, Ca' Causin, Ca' Caldara, Ca' Ferrotti, Ca' Giare, Ca' Ghedin, Ca' Leandri, Ca' Martin, Ca' Novello, Ca' Sabbioni, Ca' Sorbelle, Ca' Tresievoli, Dogaletto, Fossadonne, Giovanni XXII, La Casona, Malpaga, Mira Buse, Mira Macerata, Molin Rotto, Piazza Vecchia, Soresina, Valmarana

Government
  - Mayor: Marco Dori

Area
  - Total: 98.88 km^{2} (38.18 sq mi)
- Elevation: 6 m (20 ft)

Population (31 October 2021)
  - Total: 37,595
  - Density: 380.2/km^{2} (984.7/sq mi)
- Demonym: Miresi
- Time zone: UTC+1 (CET)
  - Summer (DST): UTC+2 (CEST)
- Postal code: 30034
- Dialing code: 041
- Patron saint: Saint Nicholas
- Saint day: December 6
- Website: Official website

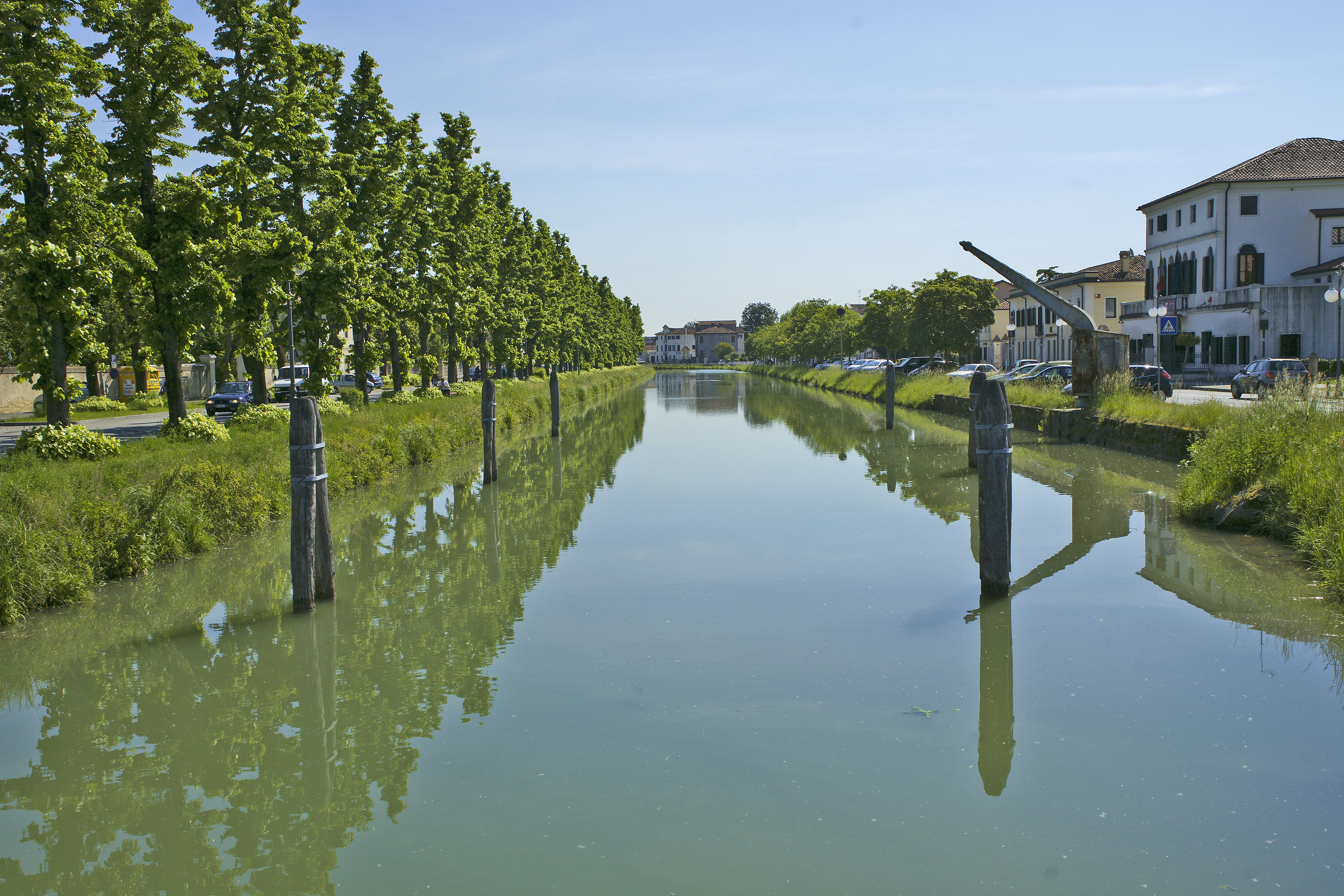
Riviera del Brenta

Mira is a comune (municipality) in the southern Veneto, northern Italy. It is part of the Metropolitan City of Venice and the 11th most populous comune of Veneto.

It is situated on the Riviera del Brenta, midway between Padua and Venice and is crossed by the SR11 (Regional Road 11). The main attractions are the Villa Foscari, designed by Andrea Palladio, and the Villa Widmann-Foscari.

The southeastern part of Mira is characterized by "barene", typical lagoon saltmarshes which are periodically submerged by the tide crossed by tidal channels. These barene constitute a third of the whole municipal area.

== People ==
- Giuseppe Carraro - Roman Catholic bishop;
- Jacopo del Cassero - medieval politician mentioned by Dante Alighieri in the 5th canto of the Purgatory;
- Maurizio Bacchin - mayor of Mira and member of the senate

== Sources ==
- (Google Maps)
