= Oriago =

Town in the province of Venice, Italy

- Frazione
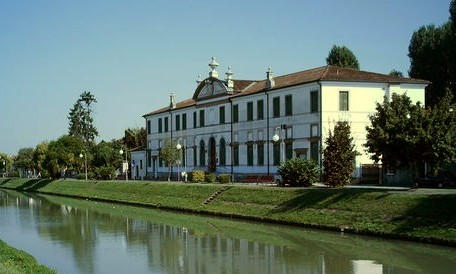
- Villa Mocenigo on the Naviglio del Brenta

- Location of Oriago in Italy
- Coordinates: 45°27′10″N 12°10′25″E
- Country: Italy
- Region: Veneto
- Metropolitan city: Venice (VE)
- Comune: Mira
- Demonym: Oriaghesi
- Time zone: UTC+1 (CET)
  - Summer (DST): UTC+2 (CEST)
- Postal code: 30034
- Dialing code: 041
- Website: Official website

Oriago is the most populous frazione of the comune of Mira, in the Metropolitan City of Venice. It was an autonomous comune until 1867.

It is the second town on the Riviera del Brenta coming from the east.

== Origin of the name ==
Oriago was referred to as Aurilia in documents from the 9th century and over time the name evolved to Aureliacus (994), Aurilagus (1077), Portu Orlaci (1143) and Urgiago (1292). It appears therefore that the names derives from the Latin name Aurelius, possibly deriving from the name of a property owner or its proximity to one of the branches of the via Aurelia.

The -ago suffix is frequently used in Veneto (for example nearby localities include Borbiago and Chirignano), and some scholars believe that this originates from the Latin word lacus or lake, referring to a body of water or marshland.

== History ==
In the past the area around Oriago was a marshy continuation of the nearby Venetian Lagoon. Its territory was under the control of the abbey of Sant'Ilario, founded in 816.

In 1298 some assassins killed Jacopo del Cassero, an enemy of the House of Este, while he was passing through Oriago on the way from Venice to Milan where he had been elected Podestà. This story is cited by Dante in Purgatorio.

Oriago represented the last the last stronghold of Padua on the Riviera del Brenta before it became a territory of the Serenissima. There were a number of conflicts between the two and Francesco Da Carrara, lord of Padua had the fortress of Portonuovo built.

== Notable places ==
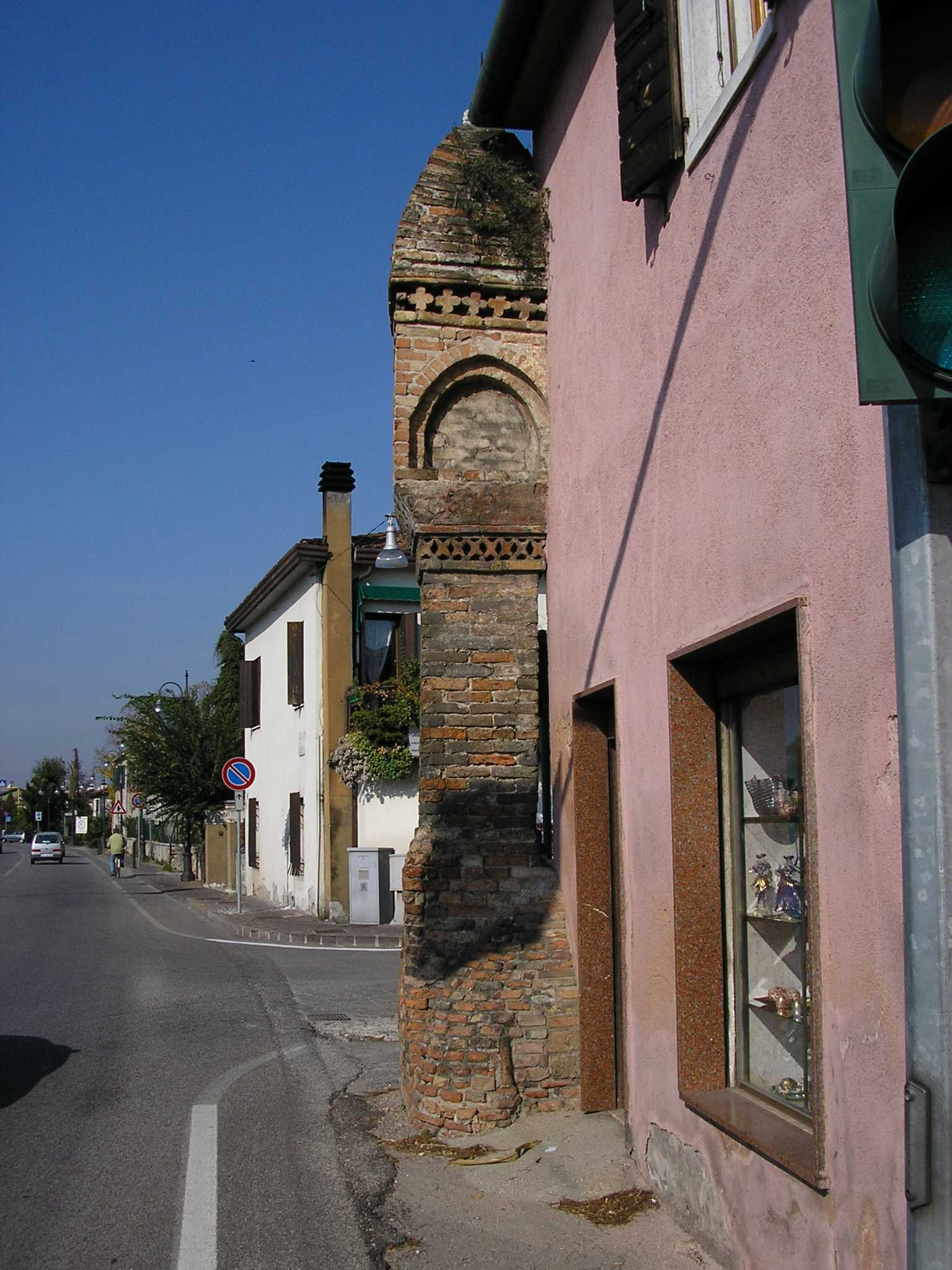
Il Termine

At the entrance to Oriago there is brick pillar called il Termine, that served to mark the border between Padua and the Republic of Venice between 1375 and 1405.

There are two parish churches: the main parish is dedicated to Mary Magdalen and was built in the 15th century and modified in the 16th century and has paintings by Jacopo Bassano. While the second parish is dedicated to Saint Peter the apostle and was built in the 20th century.

A number of venetian villas are also located in Oriago, the most notable of which are:

- Villa Allegri (16th century), which hosted a number of historical figures including Carl Ritter von Ghega, Giacomo Casanova, Auguste Marmot and Josef Radetzky while commanding the 1848 siege of Venice.
- Villa Mocenigo (17th or 18th century), which contains some paintings by Giovanbattista Tiepolo
- Palazzo Moro (15th-17th century);
- Villa Gradenigo (16th century), with frescos attributed to Benedetto Caliari, brother of Veronese.
