= Fiesso d'Artico =

Fiesso d'Artico Fieso
- Comune
- Comune di Fiesso d'Artico
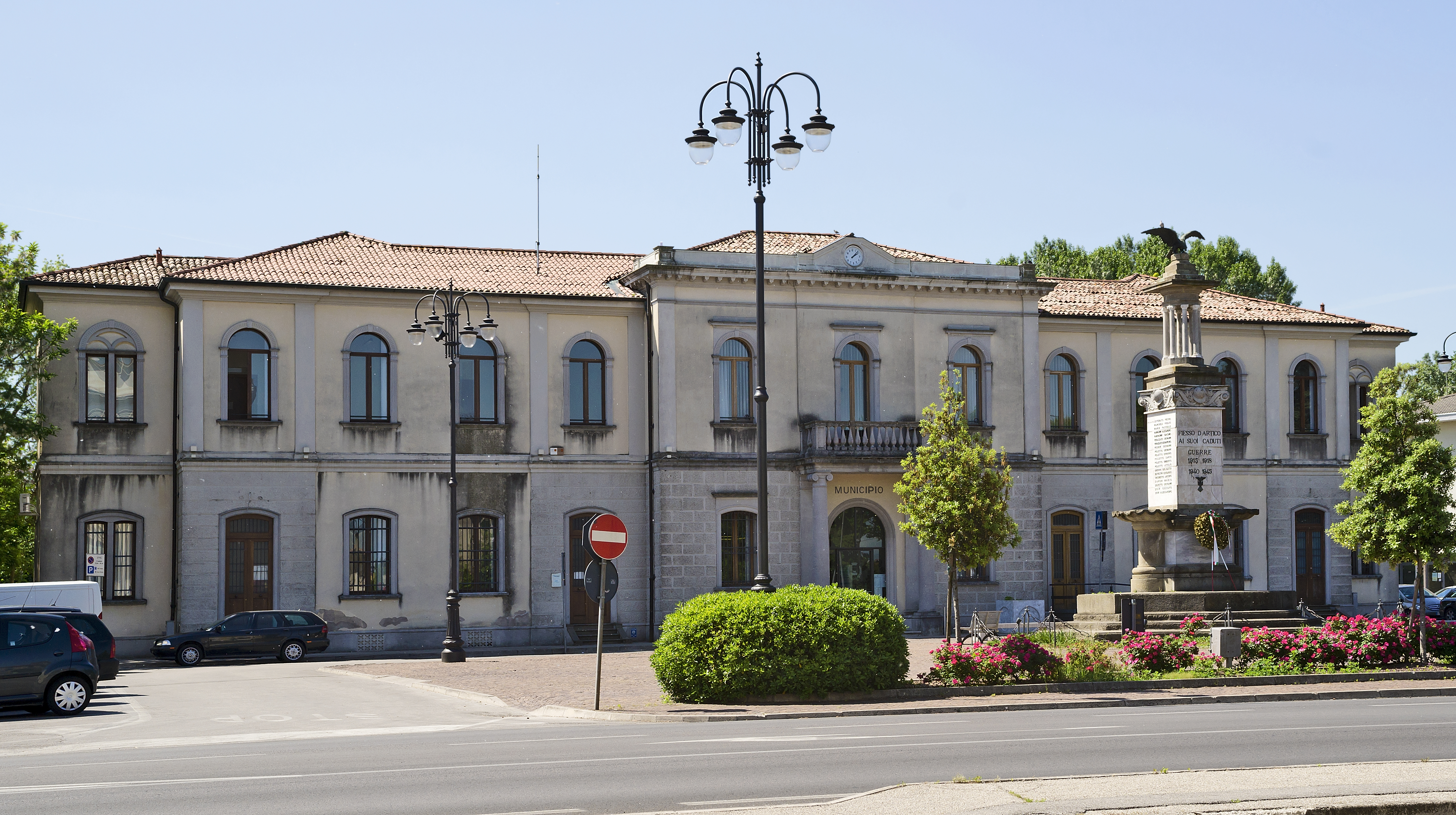
- The Town Hall

- Coat of arms
- Interactive map of Fiesso d'Artico
- Location within Italy Location within Veneto
- Coordinates: 45°25′N 12°2′E
- Country: Italy
- Region: Veneto
- Metropolitan city: Venice (VE)
- Frazioni: Dolo, Pianiga, Stra, Vigonza (PD)

Government
  - Mayor: Marco Cominato (Centre-right)

Area
  - Total: 6.31 km^{2} (2.44 sq mi)
- Elevation: 9 m (30 ft)

Population (31 December 2012)
  - Total: 7,786
  - Density: 1,230/km^{2} (3,200/sq mi)
- Demonym: Fiessesi
- Time zone: UTC+1 (CET)
  - Summer (DST): UTC+2 (CEST)
- Postal code: 30032
- Dialing code: 041
- ISTAT code: 027014
- Patron saint: St. Charles Borromeo
- Saint day: 4 November
- Website: Official website

Fiesso d'Artico (Venetian: Fieso) is a town in the Metropolitan City of Venice, Veneto, Italy. The town is connected by the SR11, and is part of the Riviera del Brenta.

Fiesso d'Artico has almost reached the remarkable age of one thousand years of official life: it is already mentioned, in fact, in documents dated 1025/1028.

It is a village of 6.31 square kilometres (2.44 mi^{2}) (it has the smaller territory of the province of Venice) on the left bank of the Brenta river, halfway between Padua and Venice.

Initially, the town was called just Fiesso, from the Latin Flexum, meaning a curve formed by the river anciently called the "Medoacus" (currently known as Brenta).

The second name Artico was added later on, in honour of the lawyer Angelo Maria Artico, the creator of the last great deviation of the river which was necessary to safeguard the town from floods as the breaking of the levees by the river Brenta happened very often, before.

In the past, this town was important as a religious center: it is recorded that a priest was appointed even by the bishop of Nicosia, in Cyprus, that was a dependence of the Republic of Venice, at the time.

The territory was divided in two large parts inclusive of many other lands which nowadays belong to nearby municipalities, such as Dolo, Stra, Vigonza.

Due to the short distance from Padua, Fiesso d'Artico was involved in many wars as a result of the struggle for the succession of several lordships in that city.

Finally Fiesso d'Artico was included in the Republic of Venice, in the fifteenth century.

Under the rule of the Republic of Venice, beautiful villas were built by the noble and rich Venetian merchants for their summer holidays and many of them still exist.

Fiesso d'Artico was connected with Venice by a boat called the "Burchiello" through navigable river ways directly up to the Grand Canal.

The citizens of Fiesso took an active role in the struggles for the independence of Veneto from the Austro-Hungarian Empire, as well as those for the liberation of Italy from Nazi-fascism during World War II.

Fiesso d'Artico offers views of the Riviera del Brenta, an area noted for its historic architecture and artistic heritage.

It is known internationally for its shoe-making businesses, particularly for women. There are currently around 200 shoe-manufacturing units, of which around 100 are involved in the proper construction of shoes, while the remainder are engaged in related aspects of the footwear industry.

== Twin towns ==
Fiesso d'Artico is twinned with:

- Saint-Marcellin, Isère, France, since 2006

== Sources ==
- (Google Maps)
