= Stra =

- Comune
- Comune di Stra
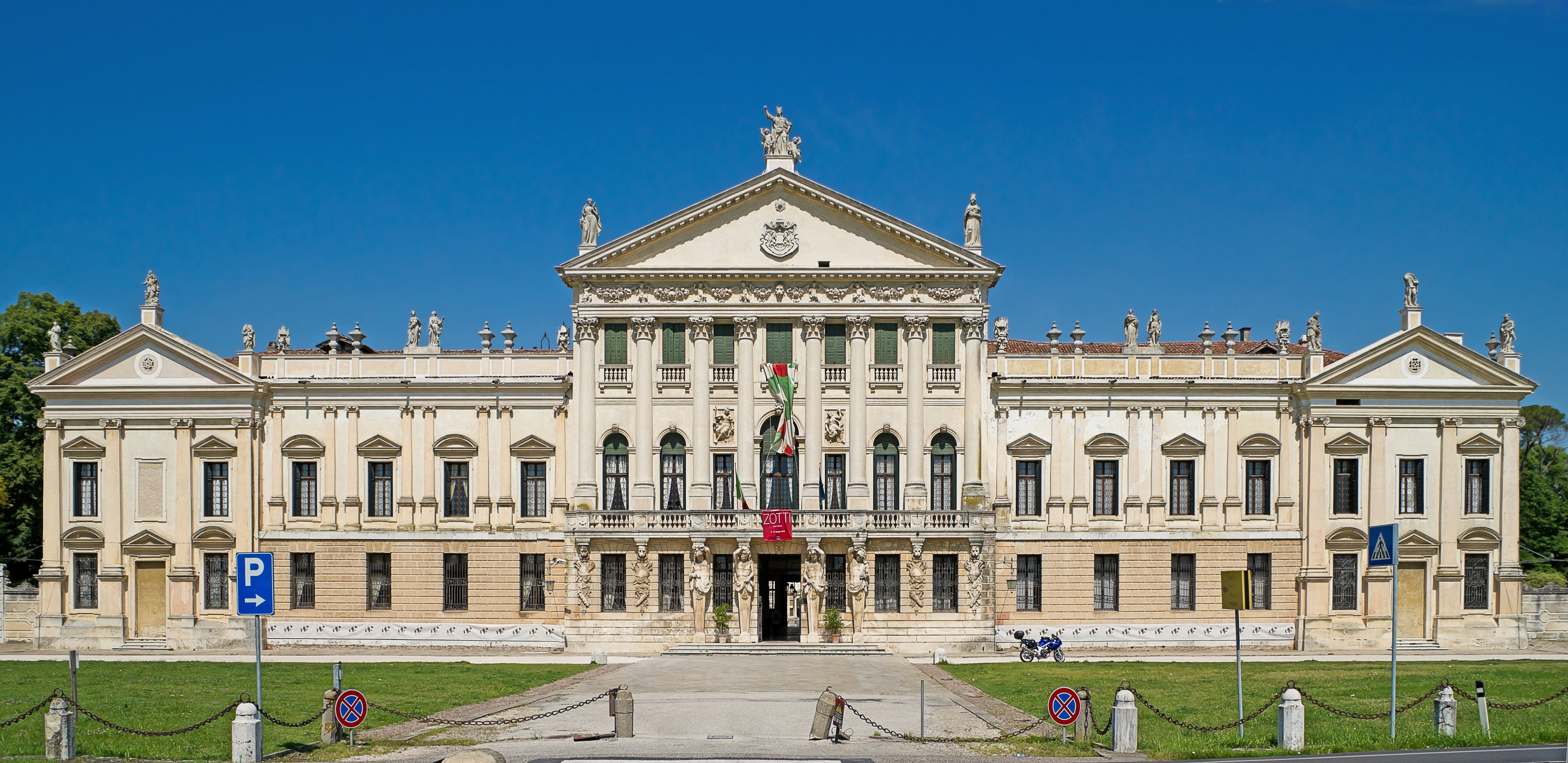
- Villa Pisani

- Coat of arms

- Location within Italy Location within Veneto
- Coordinates: 45.410°N 12.005°E
- Country: Italy
- Region: Veneto
- Metropolitan city: Venice (VE)
- Frazioni: Paluello, San Pietro

Government
  - Mayor: Andrea Salmaso (Centre-right)

Area
  - Total: 8.78 km^{2} (3.39 sq mi)
- Elevation: 9 m (30 ft)

Population (30 September 2012)
  - Total: 7,644
  - Density: 871/km^{2} (2,250/sq mi)
- Demonym: Stratesi or Stratensi
- Time zone: UTC+1 (CET)
  - Summer (DST): UTC+2 (CEST)
- Postal code: 30039
- Dialing code: 049

Stra is a town and comune in the Metropolitan City of Venice, Veneto, Italy. It is located south of SR11. It is the location of the famed Villa Pisani on the bank of the Brenta canal.
