= List of municipalities of Veneto =

Location of Veneto within Italy

Provinces of Veneto

Municipalities of Veneto

This is a list of the municipalities (comuni) of the region of Veneto in Italy.

There are 559 municipalities in Veneto as of 2026:

- 60 in the Province of Belluno
- 101 in the Province of Padua
- 50 in the Province of Rovigo
- 94 in the Province of Treviso
- 44 in the Metropolitan City of Venice
- 98 in the Province of Verona
- 112 in the Province of Vicenza

== List ==
Municipality	Province	Population (2026)	Area (km²)	Density
Abano Terme	Padua	20,479	21.41	956.5
Adria	Rovigo	18,878	113.39	166.5
Affi	Verona	2,504	9.88	253.4
Agna	Padua	3,175	18.80	168.9
Agordo	Belluno	4,062	23.74	171.1
Agugliaro	Vicenza	1,406	14.70	95.6
Albaredo d'Adige	Verona	5,298	28.25	187.5
Albettone	Vicenza	1,959	20.21	96.9
Albignasego	Padua	27,601	21.16	1,304.4
Alleghe	Belluno	1,064	29.72	35.8
Alonte	Vicenza	1,558	11.15	139.7
Alpago	Belluno	6,579	80.34	81.9
Altavilla Vicentina	Vicenza	11,760	16.72	703.3
Altissimo	Vicenza	2,157	15.09	142.9
Altivole	Treviso	7,088	21.95	322.9
Angiari	Verona	2,544	13.47	188.9
Anguillara Veneta	Padua	4,076	21.67	188.1
Annone Veneto	Venice	3,917	25.94	151.0
Arcade	Treviso	4,476	8.27	541.2
Arcole	Verona	6,419	18.87	340.2
Arcugnano	Vicenza	7,595	41.57	182.7
Ariano nel Polesine	Rovigo	3,757	80.63	46.6
Arquà Petrarca	Padua	1,781	12.52	142.3
Arquà Polesine	Rovigo	2,578	19.93	129.4
Arre	Padua	2,089	12.34	169.3
Arsiè	Belluno	2,174	64.76	33.6
Arsiero	Vicenza	3,065	41.40	74.0
Arzergrande	Padua	4,841	13.64	354.9
Arzignano	Vicenza	25,894	34.19	757.4
Asiago	Vicenza	6,203	162.95	38.1
Asigliano Veneto	Vicenza	841	8.07	104.2
Asolo	Treviso	8,917	25.37	351.5
Auronzo di Cadore	Belluno	2,982	220.65	13.5
Badia Calavena	Verona	2,707	26.94	100.5
Badia Polesine	Rovigo	10,378	44.53	233.1
Bagnoli di Sopra	Padua	3,361	34.98	96.1
Bagnolo di Po	Rovigo	1,203	21.36	56.3
Baone	Padua	3,024	24.42	123.8
Barbarano Mossano	Vicenza	6,188	33.48	184.8
Barbona	Padua	567	8.59	66.0
Bardolino	Verona	6,816	57.33	118.9
Bassano del Grappa	Vicenza	42,279	47.06	898.4
Battaglia Terme	Padua	3,869	6.23	621.0
Belfiore	Verona	3,408	26.45	128.8
Belluno	Belluno	35,499	147.22	241.1
Bergantino	Rovigo	2,340	17.97	130.2
Bevilacqua	Verona	1,817	12.20	148.9
Boara Pisani	Padua	2,362	16.66	141.8
Bolzano Vicentino	Vicenza	6,505	19.84	327.9
Bonavigo	Verona	1,990	17.99	110.6
Borca di Cadore	Belluno	790	26.76	29.5
Borgo Valbelluna	Belluno	13,620	167.69	81.2
Borgo Veneto	Padua	7,045	39.18	179.8
Borgoricco	Padua	9,084	20.39	445.5
Borso del Grappa	Treviso	5,971	33.14	180.2
Bosaro	Rovigo	1,412	6.12	230.7
Boschi Sant'Anna	Verona	1,385	8.97	154.4
Bosco Chiesanuova	Verona	3,593	64.81	55.4
Bovolenta	Padua	3,394	22.78	149.0
Bovolone	Verona	16,392	41.27	397.2
Breda di Piave	Treviso	7,642	25.76	296.7
Breganze	Vicenza	8,304	21.76	381.6
Brendola	Vicenza	6,609	25.57	258.5
Brentino Belluno	Verona	1,368	25.99	52.6
Brenzone	Verona	2,436	51.59	47.2
Bressanvido	Vicenza	3,083	8.44	365.3
Brogliano	Vicenza	4,011	12.16	329.9
Brugine	Padua	7,178	19.55	367.2
Bussolengo	Verona	21,037	24.23	868.2
Buttapietra	Verona	7,031	17.27	407.1
Cadoneghe	Padua	15,763	12.93	1,219.1
Caerano di San Marco	Treviso	7,819	12.09	646.7
Calalzo di Cadore	Belluno	1,799	43.51	41.3
Caldiero	Verona	8,160	10.37	786.9
Caldogno	Vicenza	11,304	15.88	711.8
Calto	Rovigo	699	10.85	64.4
Caltrano	Vicenza	2,544	22.71	112.0
Calvene	Vicenza	1,270	11.47	110.7
Camisano Vicentino	Vicenza	11,085	30.02	369.3
Campagna Lupia	Venice	7,116	87.59	81.2
Campiglia dei Berici	Vicenza	1,669	11.04	151.2
Campo San Martino	Padua	5,547	13.16	421.5
Campodarsego	Padua	15,128	25.72	588.2
Campodoro	Padua	2,727	11.22	243.0
Campolongo Maggiore	Venice	10,698	23.61	453.1
Camponogara	Venice	12,979	21.30	609.3
Camposampiero	Padua	11,878	21.12	562.4
Canale d'Agordo	Belluno	1,045	45.96	22.7
Canaro	Rovigo	2,569	32.65	78.7
Canda	Rovigo	812	14.37	56.5
Candiana	Padua	2,142	22.27	96.2
Caorle	Venice	10,978	153.84	71.4
Cappella Maggiore	Treviso	4,662	11.09	420.4
Caprino Veronese	Verona	8,775	47.32	185.4
Carbonera	Treviso	11,239	19.88	565.3
Carmignano di Brenta	Padua	7,546	14.68	514.0
Carrè	Vicenza	3,446	8.74	394.3
Cartigliano	Vicenza	3,637	7.38	492.8
Cartura	Padua	4,564	16.28	280.3
Casale di Scodosia	Padua	4,637	21.32	217.5
Casale sul Sile	Treviso	13,067	26.92	485.4
Casaleone	Verona	5,672	38.61	146.9
Casalserugo	Padua	5,293	15.50	341.5
Casier	Treviso	11,425	13.43	850.7
Cassola	Vicenza	15,415	12.74	1,210.0
Castagnaro	Verona	3,497	34.80	100.5
Castegnero Nanto	Vicenza	5,853	25.97	225.4
Castel d'Azzano	Verona	12,333	9.72	1,268.8
Castelbaldo	Padua	1,443	15.17	95.1
Castelcucco	Treviso	2,317	8.79	263.6
Castelfranco Veneto	Treviso	33,241	51.61	644.1
Castelgomberto	Vicenza	6,145	17.44	352.4
Castelguglielmo	Rovigo	1,510	22.13	68.2
Castello di Godego	Treviso	6,898	18.13	380.5
Castelmassa	Rovigo	4,026	11.84	340.0
Castelnovo Bariano	Rovigo	2,588	37.91	68.3
Castelnuovo del Garda	Verona	13,306	34.43	386.5
Cavaion Veronese	Verona	5,995	12.91	464.4
Cavallino-Treporti	Venice	13,105	44.71	293.1
Cavarzere	Venice	12,730	140.44	90.6
Cavaso del Tomba	Treviso	2,941	18.97	155.0
Cazzano di Tramigna	Verona	1,466	12.27	119.5
Ceggia	Venice	6,250	22.10	282.8
Cencenighe Agordino	Belluno	1,202	18.13	66.3
Ceneselli	Rovigo	1,573	28.62	55.0
Cerea	Verona	17,304	70.30	246.1
Ceregnano	Rovigo	3,377	30.17	111.9
Cerro Veronese	Verona	2,698	10.06	268.2
Cervarese Santa Croce	Padua	5,557	17.71	313.8
Cesiomaggiore	Belluno	3,954	82.10	48.2
Cessalto	Treviso	3,835	28.18	136.1
Chiampo	Vicenza	12,566	22.60	556.0
Chiarano	Treviso	3,337	19.92	167.5
Chies d'Alpago	Belluno	1,244	44.97	27.7
Chioggia	Venice	46,951	187.91	249.9
Chiuppano	Vicenza	2,560	4.71	543.5
Cibiana di Cadore	Belluno	323	21.59	15.0
Cimadolmo	Treviso	3,364	17.90	187.9
Cinto Caomaggiore	Venice	3,172	21.32	148.8
Cinto Euganeo	Padua	1,884	19.76	95.3
Cison di Valmarino	Treviso	2,411	28.81	83.7
Cittadella	Padua	20,047	36.68	546.5
Codevigo	Padua	6,280	70.02	89.7
Codogné	Treviso	5,246	21.75	241.2
Cogollo del Cengio	Vicenza	3,127	36.22	86.3
Colceresa	Vicenza	5,957	19.40	307.1
Colle Santa Lucia	Belluno	339	15.34	22.1
Colle Umberto	Treviso	4,972	13.58	366.1
Cologna Veneta	Verona	8,543	42.83	199.5
Colognola ai Colli	Verona	8,801	20.90	421.1
Comelico Superiore	Belluno	2,050	96.15	21.3
Cona	Venice	2,767	65.11	42.5
Concamarise	Verona	1,060	7.91	134.0
Concordia Sagittaria	Venice	10,212	66.84	152.8
Conegliano	Treviso	34,675	36.38	953.1
Conselve	Padua	9,993	24.29	411.4
Corbola	Rovigo	2,246	18.55	121.1
Cordignano	Treviso	6,784	26.25	258.4
Cornedo Vicentino	Vicenza	11,740	23.56	498.3
Cornuda	Treviso	6,017	12.51	481.0
Correzzola	Padua	5,273	42.33	124.6
Cortina d'Ampezzo	Belluno	5,399	252.81	21.4
Costa di Rovigo	Rovigo	2,420	16.07	150.6
Costabissara	Vicenza	7,648	13.13	582.5
Costermano	Verona	3,996	16.74	238.7
Creazzo	Vicenza	11,219	10.54	1,064.4
Crespadoro	Vicenza	1,257	30.20	41.6
Crespino	Rovigo	1,787	31.86	56.1
Crocetta del Montello	Treviso	6,074	26.57	228.6
Curtarolo	Padua	7,150	14.73	485.4
Danta di Cadore	Belluno	421	7.95	53.0
Dolcè	Verona	2,536	30.95	81.9
Dolo	Venice	14,993	24.28	617.5
Domegge di Cadore	Belluno	2,235	50.36	44.4
Due Carrare	Padua	8,974	26.56	337.9
Dueville	Vicenza	13,578	20.01	678.6
Enego	Vicenza	1,497	52.61	28.5
Eraclea	Venice	11,820	95.45	123.8
Erbè	Verona	1,922	16.10	119.4
Erbezzo	Verona	850	31.97	26.6
Este	Padua	15,856	32.81	483.3
Falcade	Belluno	1,734	52.80	32.8
Fara Vicentino	Vicenza	3,715	15.18	244.7
Farra di Soligo	Treviso	8,497	28.34	299.8
Feltre	Belluno	20,600	99.79	206.4
Ferrara di Monte Baldo	Verona	302	26.89	11.2
Ficarolo	Rovigo	2,199	18.08	121.6
Fiesso d'Artico	Venice	8,702	6.31	1,379.1
Fiesso Umbertiano	Rovigo	3,882	27.54	141.0
Follina	Treviso	3,614	24.08	150.1
Fontanelle	Treviso	5,559	35.35	157.3
Fontaniva	Padua	8,094	20.61	392.7
Fonte	Treviso	6,063	14.60	415.3
Fonzaso	Belluno	2,966	27.62	107.4
Fossalta di Piave	Venice	4,251	9.64	441.0
Fossalta di Portogruaro	Venice	5,747	31.10	184.8
Fossò	Venice	7,118	10.18	699.2
Foza	Vicenza	674	35.21	19.1
Frassinelle Polesine	Rovigo	1,326	21.98	60.3
Fratta Polesine	Rovigo	2,445	20.97	116.6
Fregona	Treviso	2,738	42.72	64.1
Fumane	Verona	4,193	34.21	122.6
Gaiarine	Treviso	5,826	28.78	202.4
Gaiba	Rovigo	932	11.99	77.7
Galliera Veneta	Padua	7,165	8.95	800.6
Gallio	Vicenza	2,354	47.87	49.2
Galzignano Terme	Padua	4,271	18.20	234.7
Gambellara	Vicenza	3,454	13.00	265.7
Garda	Verona	4,044	14.37	281.4
Gavello	Rovigo	1,418	24.37	58.2
Gazzo	Padua	4,295	22.71	189.1
Gazzo Veronese	Verona	5,226	56.66	92.2
Giacciano con Baruchella	Rovigo	2,083	18.42	113.1
Giavera del Montello	Treviso	5,110	20.19	253.1
Godega di Sant'Urbano	Treviso	6,014	24.34	247.1
Gorgo al Monticano	Treviso	3,976	27.09	146.8
Gosaldo	Belluno	511	48.48	10.5
Grantorto	Padua	4,435	14.10	314.5
Granze	Padua	1,873	11.47	163.3
Grezzana	Verona	10,775	49.49	217.7
Grisignano di Zocco	Vicenza	4,319	17.02	253.8
Gruaro	Venice	2,700	17.49	154.4
Grumolo delle Abbadesse	Vicenza	3,900	15.01	259.8
Guarda Veneta	Rovigo	1,100	17.21	63.9
Illasi	Verona	5,149	25.00	206.0
Isola della Scala	Verona	11,825	69.83	169.3
Isola Rizza	Verona	3,317	16.68	198.9
Isola Vicentina	Vicenza	10,290	26.48	388.6
Istrana	Treviso	9,088	26.48	343.2
Jesolo	Venice	27,120	96.40	281.3
La Valle Agordina	Belluno	1,040	48.67	21.4
Laghi	Vicenza	135	22.24	6.1
Lamon	Belluno	2,576	54.36	47.4
Lastebasse	Vicenza	174	18.80	9.3
Lavagno	Verona	8,730	14.64	596.3
Lazise	Verona	6,771	63.15	107.2
Legnago	Verona	26,084	79.27	329.1
Legnaro	Padua	9,564	14.91	641.4
Lendinara	Rovigo	11,538	55.06	209.6
Limana	Belluno	5,455	39.12	139.4
Limena	Padua	8,237	15.16	543.3
Livinallongo del Col di Lana	Belluno	1,218	100.01	12.2
Longare	Vicenza	5,531	22.77	242.9
Longarone	Belluno	4,982	122.36	40.7
Lonigo	Vicenza	16,058	49.42	324.9
Loreggia	Padua	7,725	19.12	404.0
Lorenzago di Cadore	Belluno	527	27.35	19.3
Loreo	Rovigo	3,177	39.84	79.7
Loria	Treviso	9,221	23.25	396.6
Lozzo Atestino	Padua	3,076	24.07	127.8
Lozzo di Cadore	Belluno	1,212	30.40	39.9
Lugo di Vicenza	Vicenza	3,510	14.56	241.1
Lusia	Rovigo	3,196	17.68	180.8
Lusiana	Vicenza	4,567	61.19	74.6
Malcesine	Verona	3,472	69.29	50.1
Malo	Vicenza	14,706	30.53	481.7
Mansuè	Treviso	4,850	27.10	179.0
Marano di Valpolicella	Verona	3,085	18.62	165.7
Marano Vicentino	Vicenza	9,211	12.73	723.6
Marcon	Venice	17,664	25.55	691.4
Mareno di Piave	Treviso	9,353	27.77	336.8
Marostica	Vicenza	14,121	36.53	386.6
Martellago	Venice	21,184	20.17	1,050.3
Maser	Treviso	5,094	25.85	197.1
Maserà di Padova	Padua	9,261	17.58	526.8
Maserada sul Piave	Treviso	9,149	28.77	318.0
Masi	Padua	1,823	13.77	132.4
Massanzago	Padua	6,112	13.22	462.3
Meduna di Livenza	Treviso	2,972	15.38	193.2
Megliadino San Vitale	Padua	1,821	15.25	119.4
Melara	Rovigo	1,704	17.58	96.9
Meolo	Venice	6,155	26.61	231.3
Merlara	Padua	2,521	21.35	118.1
Mestrino	Padua	11,953	19.22	621.9
Mezzane di Sotto	Verona	2,502	19.71	126.9
Miane	Treviso	2,978	30.88	96.4
Minerbe	Verona	4,644	29.65	156.6
Mira	Venice	37,465	99.14	377.9
Mirano	Venice	27,114	45.63	594.2
Mogliano Veneto	Treviso	28,145	46.26	608.4
Monastier di Treviso	Treviso	4,432	25.26	175.5
Monfumo	Treviso	1,300	11.45	113.5
Monselice	Padua	17,042	50.57	337.0
Montagnana	Padua	9,193	45.03	204.2
Monte di Malo	Vicenza	2,836	23.75	119.4
Montebello Vicentino	Vicenza	6,317	21.48	294.1
Montebelluna	Treviso	31,144	49.01	635.5
Montecchia di Crosara	Verona	4,323	21.06	205.3
Montecchio Maggiore	Vicenza	24,063	30.54	787.9
Montecchio Precalcino	Vicenza	4,869	14.42	337.7
Monteforte d'Alpone	Verona	8,953	20.47	437.4
Montegalda	Vicenza	3,324	17.41	190.9
Montegaldella	Vicenza	1,765	13.57	130.1
Montegrotto Terme	Padua	11,628	15.37	756.5
Monteviale	Vicenza	2,786	8.44	330.1
Monticello Conte Otto	Vicenza	9,094	10.24	888.1
Montorso Vicentino	Vicenza	3,001	9.29	323.0
Morgano	Treviso	4,513	11.76	383.8
Moriago della Battaglia	Treviso	2,857	13.76	207.6
Motta di Livenza	Treviso	10,522	37.78	278.5
Mozzecane	Verona	8,200	24.85	330.0
Musile di Piave	Venice	11,407	44.87	254.2
Mussolente	Vicenza	7,535	15.43	488.3
Negrar	Verona	16,378	40.42	405.2
Nervesa della Battaglia	Treviso	6,595	34.97	188.6
Noale	Venice	16,225	24.69	657.1
Nogara	Verona	8,488	38.78	218.9
Nogarole Rocca	Verona	3,888	29.14	133.4
Nogarole Vicentino	Vicenza	1,263	9.09	138.9
Nove	Vicenza	4,854	8.15	595.6
Noventa di Piave	Venice	7,015	18.00	389.7
Noventa Padovana	Padua	11,268	7.08	1,591.5
Noventa Vicentina	Vicenza	9,286	22.88	405.9
Occhiobello	Rovigo	12,022	32.33	371.9
Oderzo	Treviso	20,348	42.35	480.5
Oppeano	Verona	10,383	46.73	222.2
Orgiano	Vicenza	2,976	18.08	164.6
Ormelle	Treviso	4,480	18.83	237.9
Orsago	Treviso	3,720	10.71	347.3
Ospedaletto Euganeo	Padua	5,578	21.48	259.7
Ospitale di Cadore	Belluno	259	39.78	6.5
Padua	Padua	208,202	93.03	2,238.0
Paese	Treviso	22,184	38.09	582.4
Palù	Verona	1,196	13.61	87.9
Papozze	Rovigo	1,408	21.49	65.5
Pastrengo	Verona	3,089	9.00	343.2
Pedavena	Belluno	4,321	25.06	172.4
Pedemonte	Vicenza	677	12.60	53.7
Pederobba	Treviso	7,257	27.32	265.6
Perarolo di Cadore	Belluno	359	43.94	8.2
Pernumia	Padua	3,754	13.18	284.8
Pescantina	Verona	17,630	19.73	893.6
Peschiera del Garda	Verona	10,905	18.27	596.9
Pettorazza Grimani	Rovigo	1,392	21.45	64.9
Piacenza d'Adige	Padua	1,285	18.49	69.5
Pianezze	Vicenza	2,225	5.02	443.2
Pianiga	Venice	12,305	20.07	613.1
Piazzola sul Brenta	Padua	11,074	40.93	270.6
Pieve del Grappa	Treviso	6,576	37.34	176.1
Pieve di Cadore	Belluno	3,588	67.17	53.4
Pieve di Soligo	Treviso	11,452	19.02	602.1
Pincara	Rovigo	1,062	17.51	60.7
Piombino Dese	Padua	9,550	29.63	322.3
Piove di Sacco	Padua	20,291	35.73	567.9
Piovene Rocchette	Vicenza	8,327	12.91	645.0
Pojana Maggiore	Vicenza	4,249	28.62	148.5
Polesella	Rovigo	3,676	16.41	224.0
Polverara	Padua	3,428	9.84	348.4
Ponso	Padua	2,415	10.85	222.6
Ponte di Piave	Treviso	8,331	32.44	256.8
Ponte nelle Alpi	Belluno	7,903	58.14	135.9
Ponte San Nicolò	Padua	13,150	13.52	972.6
Pontecchio Polesine	Rovigo	2,222	11.53	192.7
Pontelongo	Padua	3,698	10.89	339.6
Ponzano Veneto	Treviso	13,027	22.27	585.0
Porto Tolle	Rovigo	8,607	256.88	33.5
Porto Viro	Rovigo	13,675	133.77	102.2
Portobuffolé	Treviso	747	5.08	147.0
Portogruaro	Venice	24,301	102.31	237.5
Posina	Vicenza	582	43.64	13.3
Possagno	Treviso	2,299	12.11	189.8
Pove del Grappa	Vicenza	3,133	9.84	318.4
Povegliano	Treviso	5,143	12.91	398.4
Povegliano Veronese	Verona	7,401	18.53	399.4
Pozzoleone	Vicenza	2,752	11.26	244.4
Pozzonovo	Padua	3,455	24.48	141.1
Pramaggiore	Venice	4,721	24.22	194.9
Preganziol	Treviso	16,738	23.10	724.6
Pressana	Verona	2,511	17.39	144.4
Quarto d'Altino	Venice	8,012	28.33	282.8
Quinto di Treviso	Treviso	10,093	19.04	530.1
Quinto Vicentino	Vicenza	5,836	17.40	335.4
Recoaro Terme	Vicenza	5,767	60.15	95.9
Refrontolo	Treviso	1,697	13.04	130.1
Resana	Treviso	9,340	24.89	375.3
Revine Lago	Treviso	2,099	18.79	111.7
Riese Pio X	Treviso	10,921	30.64	356.4
Rivamonte Agordino	Belluno	592	23.30	25.4
Rivoli Veronese	Verona	2,368	18.43	128.5
Roana	Vicenza	4,154	78.13	53.2
Rocca Pietore	Belluno	1,119	73.29	15.3
Romano d'Ezzelino	Vicenza	14,002	21.35	655.8
Roncà	Verona	3,755	18.15	206.9
Roncade	Treviso	14,592	61.78	236.2
Ronco all'Adige	Verona	6,195	42.82	144.7
Rosà	Vicenza	14,653	24.32	602.5
Rosolina	Rovigo	6,043	74.69	80.9
Rossano Veneto	Vicenza	8,296	10.60	782.6
Rotzo	Vicenza	644	28.25	22.8
Roverchiara	Verona	2,596	19.65	132.1
Roverè Veronese	Verona	2,169	36.55	59.3
Roveredo di Guà	Verona	1,657	10.16	163.1
Rovigo	Rovigo	49,994	108.81	459.5
Rovolon	Padua	4,863	27.69	175.6
Rubano	Padua	17,243	14.51	1,188.4
Saccolongo	Padua	5,029	13.80	364.4
Salara	Rovigo	1,027	14.16	72.5
Salcedo	Vicenza	989	6.12	161.6
Salgareda	Treviso	6,523	27.55	236.8
Salizzole	Verona	3,758	30.70	122.4
Salzano	Venice	12,768	17.18	743.2
San Bellino	Rovigo	1,075	15.83	67.9
San Biagio di Callalta	Treviso	12,631	48.51	260.4
San Bonifacio	Verona	21,399	33.79	633.3
San Donà di Piave	Venice	42,261	78.88	535.8
San Fior	Treviso	6,843	17.82	384.0
San Giorgio delle Pertiche	Padua	10,092	18.86	535.1
San Giorgio in Bosco	Padua	6,307	28.35	222.5
San Giovanni Ilarione	Verona	4,848	25.40	190.9
San Giovanni Lupatoto	Verona	25,427	19.01	1,337.6
San Gregorio nelle Alpi	Belluno	1,582	19.12	82.7
San Martino Buon Albergo	Verona	16,797	34.75	483.4
San Martino di Lupari	Padua	13,319	24.12	552.2
San Martino di Venezze	Rovigo	3,806	31.05	122.6
San Mauro di Saline	Verona	606	11.24	53.9
San Michele al Tagliamento	Venice	11,329	114.39	99.0
San Nicolò di Comelico	Belluno	368	24.16	15.2
San Pietro di Cadore	Belluno	1,412	52.13	27.1
San Pietro di Feletto	Treviso	5,132	19.26	266.5
San Pietro di Morubio	Verona	3,145	16.12	195.1
San Pietro in Cariano	Verona	12,996	20.24	642.1
San Pietro in Gu	Padua	4,107	17.90	229.4
San Pietro Mussolino	Vicenza	1,504	4.11	365.9
San Pietro Viminario	Padua	2,982	13.31	224.0
San Polo di Piave	Treviso	4,795	20.98	228.6
San Stino di Livenza	Venice	12,726	67.97	187.2
San Tomaso Agordino	Belluno	593	19.18	30.9
San Vendemiano	Treviso	9,680	18.51	523.0
San Vito di Cadore	Belluno	1,925	61.62	31.2
San Vito di Leguzzano	Vicenza	3,502	6.13	571.3
San Zeno di Montagna	Verona	1,544	28.24	54.7
San Zenone degli Ezzelini	Treviso	7,318	19.97	366.4
Sandrigo	Vicenza	8,226	27.99	293.9
Sanguinetto	Verona	4,318	13.51	319.6
Sant'Ambrogio di Valpolicella	Verona	11,870	23.50	505.1
Sant'Angelo di Piove di Sacco	Padua	7,347	13.97	525.9
Sant'Anna d'Alfaedo	Verona	2,660	43.43	61.2
Sant'Elena	Padua	2,514	8.92	281.8
Sant'Urbano	Padua	1,914	31.92	60.0
Santa Caterina d'Este	Padua	2,319	26.89	86.2
Santa Giustina	Belluno	6,621	35.92	184.3
Santa Giustina in Colle	Padua	7,139	17.97	397.3
Santa Lucia di Piave	Treviso	9,056	19.81	457.1
Santa Maria di Sala	Venice	17,488	28.05	623.5
Santo Stefano di Cadore	Belluno	2,276	100.62	22.6
Santorso	Vicenza	5,633	13.21	426.4
Saonara	Padua	10,877	13.54	803.3
Sarcedo	Vicenza	5,299	13.85	382.6
Sarego	Vicenza	6,868	23.92	287.1
Sarmede	Treviso	2,960	18.01	164.4
Schiavon	Vicenza	2,601	12.00	216.8
Schio	Vicenza	38,989	66.21	588.9
Scorzè	Venice	18,996	33.29	570.6
Sedico	Belluno	10,134	91.20	111.1
Segusino	Treviso	1,804	18.23	99.0
Selva di Cadore	Belluno	504	33.33	15.1
Selva di Progno	Verona	921	41.34	22.3
Selvazzano Dentro	Padua	22,931	19.52	1,174.7
Seren del Grappa	Belluno	2,323	62.53	37.2
Sernaglia della Battaglia	Treviso	6,145	20.15	305.0
Setteville	Belluno	5,952	82.43	72.2
Silea	Treviso	10,459	18.95	551.9
Soave	Verona	7,126	22.72	313.6
Solagna	Vicenza	1,830	15.81	115.7
Solesino	Padua	6,712	10.14	661.9
Sommacampagna	Verona	14,480	40.83	354.6
Sona	Verona	17,761	41.15	431.6
Sorgà	Verona	2,979	31.54	94.5
Sospirolo	Belluno	3,130	65.86	47.5
Sossano	Vicenza	4,136	20.90	197.9
Soverzene	Belluno	362	14.79	24.5
Sovizzo	Vicenza	8,213	23.61	347.9
Sovramonte	Belluno	1,287	50.55	25.5
Spinea	Venice	27,933	14.96	1,867.2
Spresiano	Treviso	12,400	25.73	481.9
Stanghella	Padua	4,165	19.81	210.2
Stienta	Rovigo	3,019	24.02	125.7
Stra	Venice	7,506	8.82	851.0
Susegana	Treviso	11,698	44.10	265.3
Taglio di Po	Rovigo	7,836	78.68	99.6
Taibon Agordino	Belluno	1,710	90.06	19.0
Tambre	Belluno	1,261	45.27	27.9
Tarzo	Treviso	4,119	23.91	172.3
Teglio Veneto	Venice	2,224	11.44	194.4
Teolo	Padua	8,930	31.20	286.2
Terrassa Padovana	Padua	2,716	14.81	183.4
Terrazzo	Verona	2,143	20.53	104.4
Tezze sul Brenta	Vicenza	12,999	17.93	725.0
Thiene	Vicenza	24,330	19.70	1,235.0
Tombolo	Padua	8,184	11.02	742.6
Tonezza del Cimone	Vicenza	511	13.94	36.7
Torre di Mosto	Venice	4,753	38.00	125.1
Torrebelvicino	Vicenza	5,860	20.74	282.5
Torreglia	Padua	6,029	18.85	319.8
Torri del Benaco	Verona	2,856	46.30	61.7
Torri di Quartesolo	Vicenza	11,817	18.67	632.9
Trebaseleghe	Padua	12,968	30.66	423.0
Trecenta	Rovigo	2,605	35.08	74.3
Tregnago	Verona	5,065	37.35	135.6
Trevenzuolo	Verona	2,801	26.94	104.0
Trevignano	Treviso	10,676	26.50	402.9
Treviso	Treviso	86,113	55.58	1,549.4
Tribano	Padua	4,219	19.23	219.4
Trissino	Vicenza	8,651	21.96	393.9
Urbana	Padua	2,016	17.02	118.4
Val di Zoldo	Belluno	2,708	141.65	19.1
Val Liona	Vicenza	3,072	27.85	110.3
Valbrenta	Vicenza	4,867	93.36	52.1
Valdagno	Vicenza	25,801	50.22	513.8
Valdastico	Vicenza	1,186	23.95	49.5
Valdobbiadene	Treviso	9,872	62.90	156.9
Valeggio sul Mincio	Verona	16,040	63.96	250.8
Vallada Agordina	Belluno	458	13.00	35.2
Valle di Cadore	Belluno	1,812	40.64	44.6
Valli del Pasubio	Vicenza	3,018	49.35	61.2
Vazzola	Treviso	6,674	26.16	255.1
Vedelago	Treviso	16,558	61.85	267.7
Veggiano	Padua	4,812	16.41	293.2
Velo d'Astico	Vicenza	2,224	21.90	101.6
Velo Veronese	Verona	772	18.90	40.8
Venice	Venice	249,385	415.90	599.6
Verona	Verona	255,139	198.92	1,282.6
Veronella	Verona	5,189	20.88	248.5
Vescovana	Padua	1,646	22.25	74.0
Vestenanova	Verona	2,499	24.18	103.3
Vicenza	Vicenza	110,741	80.57	1,374.5
Vidor	Treviso	3,559	13.43	265.0
Vigasio	Verona	10,342	30.76	336.2
Vigo di Cadore	Belluno	1,322	70.07	18.9
Vigodarzere	Padua	13,281	19.92	666.7
Vigonovo	Venice	9,814	12.87	762.5
Vigonza	Padua	23,465	33.32	704.2
Villa Bartolomea	Verona	5,895	52.99	111.2
Villa del Conte	Padua	5,617	17.35	323.7
Villa Estense	Padua	2,021	16.01	126.2
Villadose	Rovigo	4,640	32.07	144.7
Villafranca di Verona	Verona	32,785	57.34	571.8
Villafranca Padovana	Padua	10,580	23.96	441.6
Villaga	Vicenza	1,924	23.23	82.8
Villamarzana	Rovigo	1,112	14.15	78.6
Villanova del Ghebbo	Rovigo	1,933	11.73	164.8
Villanova di Camposampiero	Padua	6,140	12.23	502.0
Villanova Marchesana	Rovigo	876	18.05	48.5
Villaverla	Vicenza	6,006	15.79	380.4
Villorba	Treviso	17,563	30.53	575.3
Vittorio Veneto	Treviso	27,242	82.80	329.0
Vo'	Padua	3,211	20.37	157.6
Vodo Cadore	Belluno	822	46.88	17.5
Volpago del Montello	Treviso	9,989	44.82	222.9
Voltago Agordino	Belluno	785	23.47	33.4
Zanè	Vicenza	6,498	7.65	849.4
Zenson di Piave	Treviso	1,765	9.50	185.8
Zermeghedo	Vicenza	1,333	2.97	448.8
Zero Branco	Treviso	11,695	26.06	448.8
Zevio	Verona	15,937	54.87	290.5
Zimella	Verona	4,881	20.10	242.8
Zoppè di Cadore	Belluno	175	4.33	40.4
Zovencedo	Vicenza	815	9.04	90.2
Zugliano	Vicenza	6,850	13.73	498.9

== See also ==
- List of municipalities of Italy
