= List of municipalities of the Province of Vicenza =

The following is a list of the 112 municipalities (comuni) of the Province of Vicenza in the region of Veneto in Italy.

== List ==
Municipality	Population (2026)	Area (km²)	Density
Agugliaro	1,406	14.70	95.6
Albettone	1,959	20.21	96.9
Alonte	1,558	11.15	139.7
Altavilla Vicentina	11,760	16.72	703.3
Altissimo	2,157	15.09	142.9
Arcugnano	7,595	41.57	182.7
Arsiero	3,065	41.40	74.0
Arzignano	25,894	34.19	757.4
Asiago	6,203	162.95	38.1
Asigliano Veneto	841	8.07	104.2
Barbarano Mossano	6,188	33.48	184.8
Bassano del Grappa	42,279	47.06	898.4
Bolzano Vicentino	6,505	19.84	327.9
Breganze	8,304	21.76	381.6
Brendola	6,609	25.57	258.5
Bressanvido	3,083	8.44	365.3
Brogliano	4,011	12.16	329.9
Caldogno	11,304	15.88	711.8
Caltrano	2,544	22.71	112.0
Calvene	1,270	11.47	110.7
Camisano Vicentino	11,085	30.02	369.3
Campiglia dei Berici	1,669	11.04	151.2
Carrè	3,446	8.74	394.3
Cartigliano	3,637	7.38	492.8
Cassola	15,415	12.74	1,210.0
Castegnero Nanto	5,853	25.97	225.4
Castelgomberto	6,145	17.44	352.4
Chiampo	12,566	22.60	556.0
Chiuppano	2,560	4.71	543.5
Cogollo del Cengio	3,127	36.22	86.3
Colceresa	5,957	19.40	307.1
Cornedo Vicentino	11,740	23.56	498.3
Costabissara	7,648	13.13	582.5
Creazzo	11,219	10.54	1,064.4
Crespadoro	1,257	30.20	41.6
Dueville	13,578	20.01	678.6
Enego	1,497	52.61	28.5
Fara Vicentino	3,715	15.18	244.7
Foza	674	35.21	19.1
Gallio	2,354	47.87	49.2
Gambellara	3,454	13.00	265.7
Grisignano di Zocco	4,319	17.02	253.8
Grumolo delle Abbadesse	3,900	15.01	259.8
Isola Vicentina	10,290	26.48	388.6
Laghi	135	22.24	6.1
Lastebasse	174	18.80	9.3
Longare	5,531	22.77	242.9
Lonigo	16,058	49.42	324.9
Lugo di Vicenza	3,510	14.56	241.1
Lusiana	4,567	61.19	74.6
Malo	14,706	30.53	481.7
Marano Vicentino	9,211	12.73	723.6
Marostica	14,121	36.53	386.6
Monte di Malo	2,836	23.75	119.4
Montebello Vicentino	6,317	21.48	294.1
Montecchio Maggiore	24,063	30.54	787.9
Montecchio Precalcino	4,869	14.42	337.7
Montegalda	3,324	17.41	190.9
Montegaldella	1,765	13.57	130.1
Monteviale	2,786	8.44	330.1
Monticello Conte Otto	9,094	10.24	888.1
Montorso Vicentino	3,001	9.29	323.0
Mussolente	7,535	15.43	488.3
Nogarole Vicentino	1,263	9.09	138.9
Nove	4,854	8.15	595.6
Noventa Vicentina	9,286	22.88	405.9
Orgiano	2,976	18.08	164.6
Pedemonte	677	12.60	53.7
Pianezze	2,225	5.02	443.2
Piovene Rocchette	8,327	12.91	645.0
Pojana Maggiore	4,249	28.62	148.5
Posina	582	43.64	13.3
Pove del Grappa	3,133	9.84	318.4
Pozzoleone	2,752	11.26	244.4
Quinto Vicentino	5,836	17.40	335.4
Recoaro Terme	5,767	60.15	95.9
Roana	4,154	78.13	53.2
Romano d'Ezzelino	14,002	21.35	655.8
Rosà	14,653	24.32	602.5
Rossano Veneto	8,296	10.60	782.6
Rotzo	644	28.25	22.8
Salcedo	989	6.12	161.6
San Pietro Mussolino	1,504	4.11	365.9
San Vito di Leguzzano	3,502	6.13	571.3
Sandrigo	8,226	27.99	293.9
Santorso	5,633	13.21	426.4
Sarcedo	5,299	13.85	382.6
Sarego	6,868	23.92	287.1
Schiavon	2,601	12.00	216.8
Schio	38,989	66.21	588.9
Solagna	1,830	15.81	115.7
Sossano	4,136	20.90	197.9
Sovizzo	8,213	23.61	347.9
Tezze sul Brenta	12,999	17.93	725.0
Thiene	24,330	19.70	1,235.0
Tonezza del Cimone	511	13.94	36.7
Torrebelvicino	5,860	20.74	282.5
Torri di Quartesolo	11,817	18.67	632.9
Trissino	8,651	21.96	393.9
Val Liona	3,072	27.85	110.3
Valbrenta	4,867	93.36	52.1
Valdagno	25,801	50.22	513.8
Valdastico	1,186	23.95	49.5
Valli del Pasubio	3,018	49.35	61.2
Velo d'Astico	2,224	21.90	101.6
Vicenza	110,741	80.57	1,374.5
Villaga	1,924	23.23	82.8
Villaverla	6,006	15.79	380.4
Zanè	6,498	7.65	849.4
Zermeghedo	1,333	2.97	448.8
Zovencedo	815	9.04	90.2
Zugliano	6,850	13.73	498.9

== See also ==
- List of municipalities of Veneto
- List of municipalities of Italy
