= Montecchio Maggiore =

Montecchio Maggiore Montécio Majore
- Comune
- Comune di Montecchio Maggiore
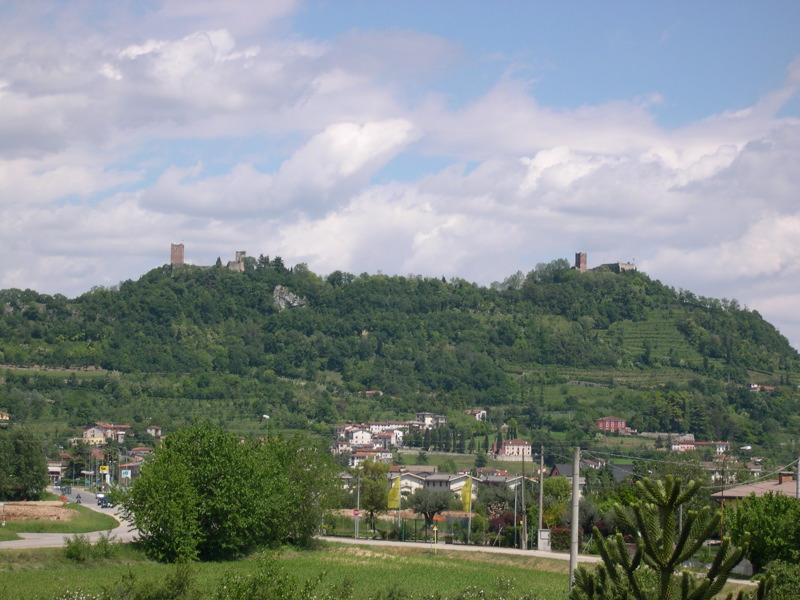
- View of Montecchio Maggiore

- Coat of arms

- Location within Italy Location within Veneto
- Coordinates: 45°30′N 11°25′E
- Country: Italy
- Region: Veneto
- Province: Vicenza (VI)
- Frazioni: Alte Ceccato, Bernuffi, Ghisa, Santissima Trinità, Sant'Urbano, Valdimolino, Carbonara

Government
  - Mayor: Silvio Parise: centre-left coalition: Insieme X Montecchio, Parise Sindaco 2024, Montecchio Democratica

Area
  - Total: 30.67 km^{2} (11.84 sq mi)
- Elevation: 72 m (236 ft)

Population (31 December 2025)
  - Total: 24,096
  - Density: 785.7/km^{2} (2,035/sq mi)
- Demonym: Montecchiani
- Time zone: UTC+1 (CET)
  - Summer (DST): UTC+2 (CEST)
- Postal code: 36075
- Dialing code: +39 0444
- Patron saint: San Vitale
- Saint day: February 8
- Website: Official website

Montecchio Maggiore (Venetian: Montécio Majore) is a town and comune in the province of Vicenza, Veneto, Italy. It is situated approximately 12 kilometres (7 miles) west of Vicenza and 43 km (27 miles) east of Verona; SP 246 provincial road passes through it.

Montecchio Maggiore borders the following municipalities: Altavilla Vicentina, Arzignano, Brendola, Castelgomberto, Montebello Vicentino, Montorso Vicentino, Sovizzo, Trissino, Zermeghedo.

== History ==
The land of Montecchio Maggiore has been inhabited since the late Stone Age, though it was invaded and occupied many times. Two castles built about 975 are claimed to be the inspiration for the Romeo and Juliet legend. Luigi da Porto of Vicenza set the story here in his novel of 1552.

=== PFAS Contamination ===
In 2013, following the PFAS emergency in Veneto, the municipality of Montecchio entered the Orange Zone due to the widespread chemical contamination caused by the Miteni plant in Trissino, located on the municipality's border, 7 kilometers north of the historic center. In the following years, Montecchio became the political center of the contamination: the Health Director of the Veneto Region, Domenico Mantoan, launched the "regional health alarm" at the Civic Hall on April 28, 2016; the Veneto Region's Head of Prevention and Food Safety, Francesca Russo, spoke for the first time about an "environmental disaster" during the large assembly convened by citizens at the Cinema di San Pietro on February 17, 2017; the first large demonstrations and marches began from Montecchio, which would lead to the closure of the Miteni plant and the trial at the Assize Court in Vicenza..

According to an independent investigation conducted by Greenpeace Italy, the results of which were published in January 2025, as of the same date, the Montecchio Maggiore water supply network did not appear to be contaminated by PFAS.

== Main sights ==
- Villa Cordellina Lombardi, is a masterpiece of neo-Palladian architect Giorgio Massari, with 18th-century frescoes by Giovanni Battista Tiepolo.
- Museum Zannato, founded in 1922 by Giuseppe Zannato, its first curator. It has sections devoted to archaeological and paleontological finds. Some of these contain materials found in the late-Roman necropolis of Carpanè. There is also an important gemological section.
- Castle Bellaguardia (called "Castle of Juliet")
- Castello della Villa (called "Castle of Romeo")

== International relations ==
Montecchio Maggiore is twinned with:

- Passau, Germany, from 2003
- Alton, Hampshire, United Kingdom
- Carloforte, Italy, from 2009.

== Sources ==
- Giambattista Tiepolo, 1696-1770, a full text exhibition catalog from The Metropolitan Museum of Art, which includes material on Montecchio Maggiore
