= Brogliano =

- Comune
- Comune di Brogliano
- Location within Italy Location within Veneto
- Coordinates: 45°35′N 11°22′E
- Country: Italy
- Region: Veneto
- Province: Vicenza (VI)
- Frazioni: Altissimo, Castelgomberto, Cornedo Vicentino, Nogarole Vicentino, Trissino, Valdagno,

Area
  - Total: 12 km^{2} (4.6 sq mi)
- Elevation: 172 m (564 ft)

Population (28 February 2007)
  - Total: 3,509
  - Density: 290/km^{2} (760/sq mi)
- Demonym: Broglianesi
- Time zone: UTC+1 (CET)
  - Summer (DST): UTC+2 (CEST)
- Postal code: 36070
- Dialing code: 0445
- ISTAT code: 024017
- Patron saint: Santa Maria Assunta
- Saint day: 15 August
- Website: Official website

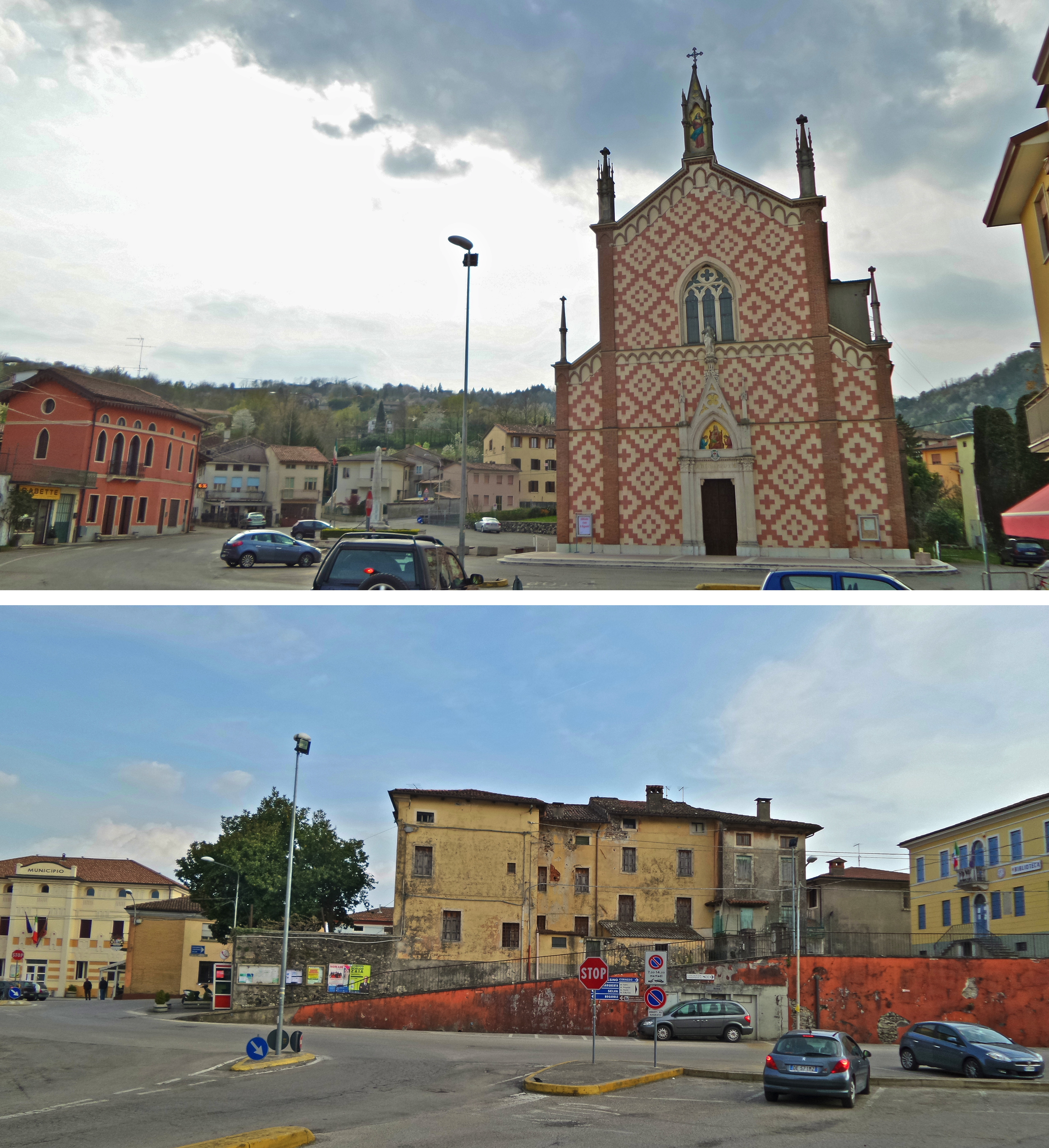
Church (top) and street (bottom) in Brogliano

Brogliano is a town in the province of Vicenza, Veneto, Italy. It is southeast of SP246.

== Sources ==
- (Google Maps)
