= Vestenanova =

- Comune
- Comune di Vestenanova
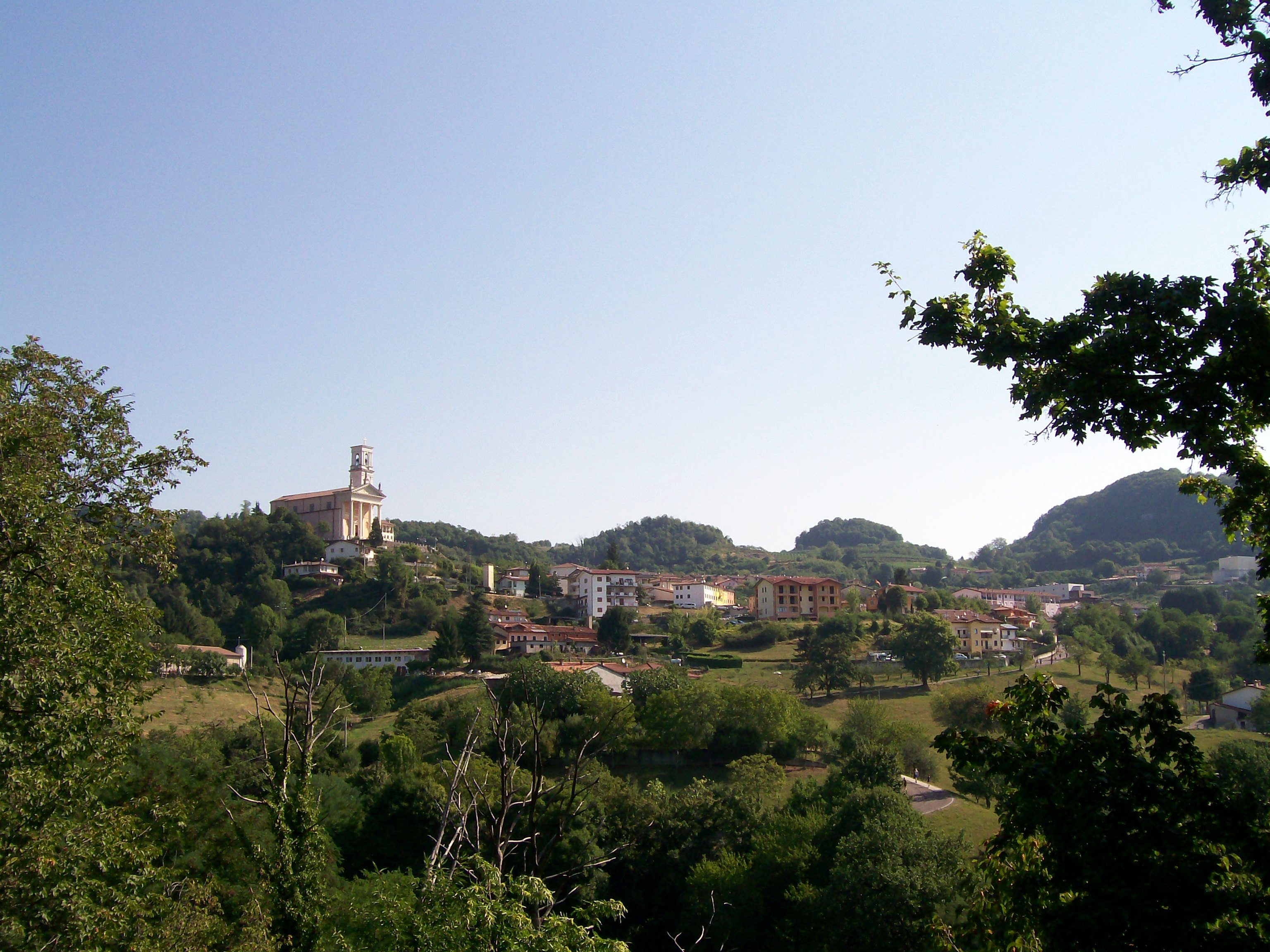

- Location within Italy Location within Veneto
- Coordinates: 45°34′N 11°14′E
- Country: Italy
- Region: Veneto
- Province: Verona (VR)
- Frazioni: Castelvero, Bolca, Vestenavecchia

Government
  - Mayor: Stefano Presa

Area
  - Total: 24.18 km^{2} (9.34 sq mi)
- Elevation: 515 m (1,690 ft)

Population (31 December 2015)
  - Total: 2,608
  - Density: 107.9/km^{2} (279.4/sq mi)
- Demonym: Vestenari
- Time zone: UTC+1 (CET)
  - Summer (DST): UTC+2 (CEST)
- Postal code: 37030
- Dialing code: 045
- Website: Official website

Vestenanova is a comune (municipality) in the Province of Verona in the Italian region Veneto, located about 90 kilometres (56 mi) west of Venice and about 25 kilometres (16 mi) northeast of Verona.

Vestenanova borders the following municipalities: Altissimo, Badia Calavena, Chiampo, Crespadoro, San Giovanni Ilarione, San Pietro Mussolino, Selva di Progno, and Tregnago.

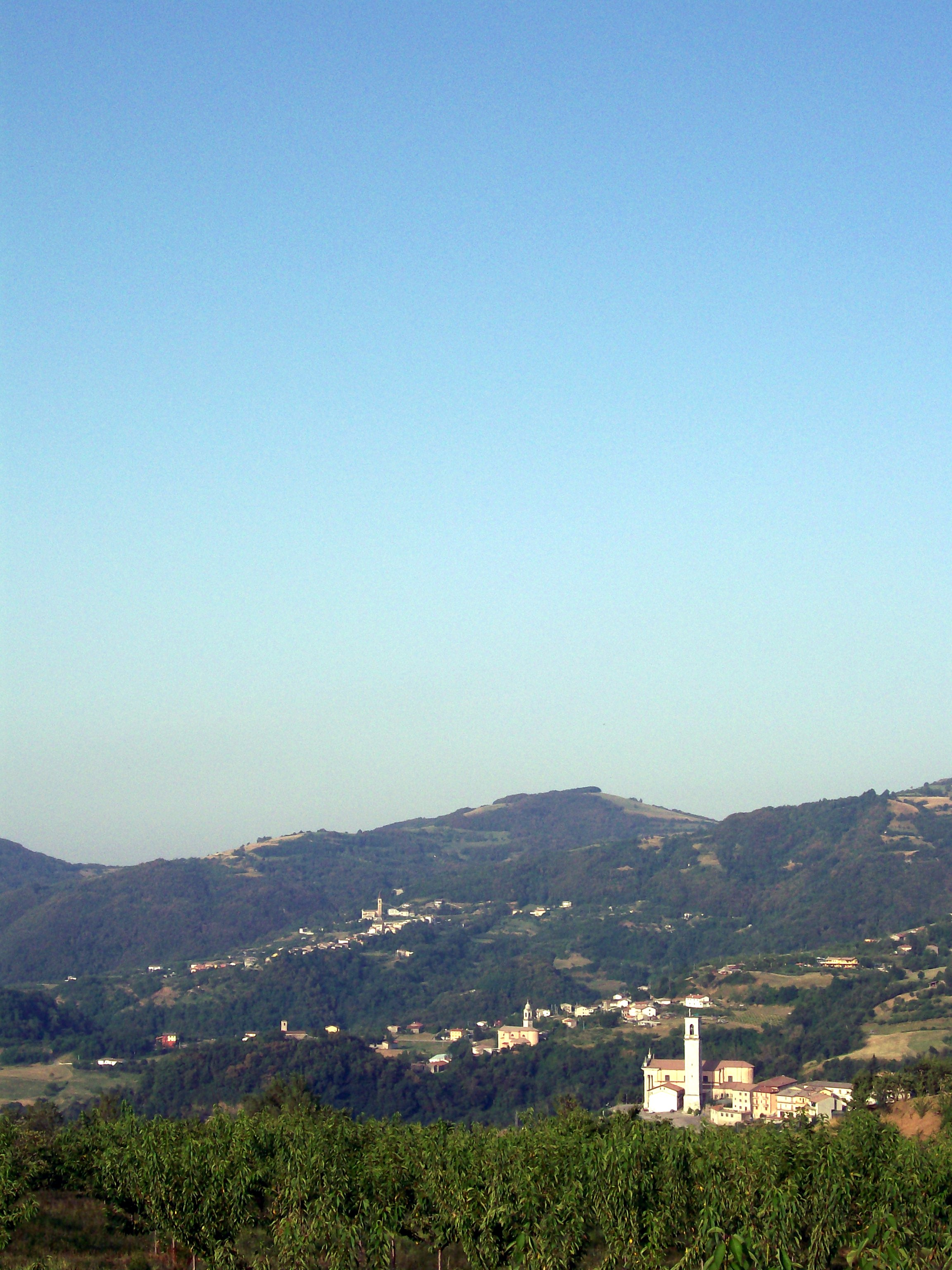
Aerial view of Vestenanova

== Twin towns ==
Vestenanova is twinned with:

- Eichstätt, Germany
