= Roncà =

- Comune
- Comune di Roncà
- Location within Italy Location within Veneto
- Coordinates: 45°29′N 11°17′E
- Country: Italy
- Region: Veneto
- Province: Province of Verona (VR)
- Frazioni: Terrossa, S. Margherita, Brenton

Government
  - Mayor: Lorella Mansoldo in Roncolato (since 14 June 2004)

Area
  - Total: 18.22 km^{2} (7.03 sq mi)
- Elevation: 78 m (256 ft)

Population (1 June 2007)
  - Total: 3,585
  - Density: 196.8/km^{2} (509.6/sq mi)
- Demonym: Roncadesi
- Time zone: UTC+1 (CET)
  - Summer (DST): UTC+2 (CEST)
- Postal code: 37030
- Dialing code: 045

Roncà is a comune (township) in the Province of Verona in the Italian region Veneto, located about 80 kilometres (50 mi) west of Venice and about 25 kilometres (16 mi) east of Verona. As of 1 June 2007, it had an area of 18.22 square kilometres (7.03 mi^{2}). According to the 2021 census 3752 people were living in Roncà.

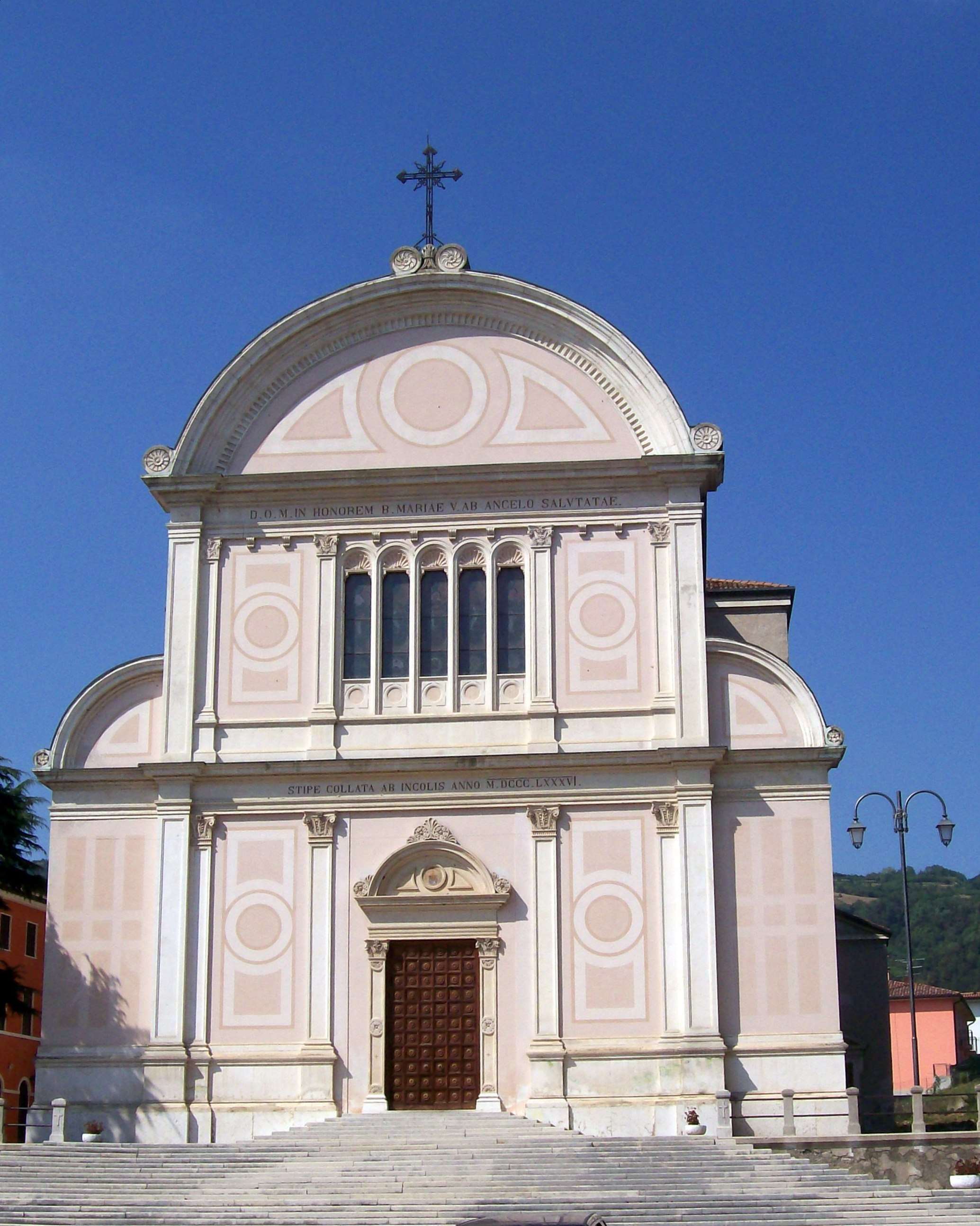
Parish church

The municipality of Roncà contains the frazione (subdivision) Terrossa, S. Margherita and Brenton.

Roncà borders the following municipalities: Arzignano, Chiampo, Gambellara, Montebello Vicentino, Montecchia di Crosara, Montorso Vicentino, and San Giovanni Ilarione.

== Demographic evolution ==
Historical population

Year	Pop.	±%
1861	?	—
1871	2,994	—
1881	3,382	+13.0%
1901	3,732	+10.3%
1911	4,343	+16.4%

Year	Pop.	±%
1921	4,298	−1.0%
1931	4,170	−3.0%
1936	4,198	+0.7%
1951	4,252	+1.3%
1961	3,608	−15.1%

Year	Pop.	±%
1971	3,246	−10.0%
1981	3,201	−1.4%
1991	3,292	+2.8%
2001	3,385	+2.8%

Source: Data from ISTAT

== Twin towns ==
Roncà is twinned with:

- Wackernheim, Germany, since 2000

== See also ==
- Durello (wine)
