= Berici Hills =

Coordinates: 45.4333°N 11.5167°E

The Berici Hills (Italian: Colli Berici) are a group of hills in northeastern Italy, a special formation in the alluvial plain on which stands the city of Vicenza, originated on the bottom of an ancient sea over at least a hundred million years. Important for the top area is the Monte Berico.

== Geography ==
The Berici Hills stand out, south of Vicenza, with the shape of a parallelogram, whose major axis is oriented towards the Northeast. It is about 24 km (15 mi), and with a total area of about 165 km². The profile is evenly curved, compact and not particularly high on the level of the plain.

The edges are jagged enough on each side, with alternating indentations and sinuosity or with simple engravings on the sides, the "scaranti". The sides are all pretty sweet and straight, except for the southeast side, which shows a nearly continuous sequence of nude and vertical cliffs.

Important place of recreation for many of the weekend vicentini is the lake that lies at the heart of high hills, the Fimon Lake.

== Geology ==
The rocks, in most carbonatic, which consists of the backbone of the Colli Berici lead to attach to a marine hills. Moreover, the discovery of several bodies, animals and plants, as fossil (molluscs, sea urchins, corals, algae, etc.). It is assumed that the sequence of rock layers is the result of a slow and steady process of deposition of sand, mud and fragments of shells on the bottom of a sea.

== Flora ==
The flora is characterized by berica thermophilous vegetation, the environment a hot climate, or microterme, usually live at altitudes well above. This situation is due to the huge climate changes which has undergone the place over millions of years: in Ice Age is probably formed a flora microterma, approached a thermophilous vegetation in the immediately subsequent to a progressive warming of the globe.

== Towns of Berici Hills ==
- Alonte
- Arcugnano
- Barbarano Vicentino
- Brendola
- Castegnero
- Grancona
- Longare
- Lonigo
- Mossano
- Nanto
- Orgiano
- San Germano dei Berici
- Sossano
- Villaga
- Zovencedo
