= Nogarole =

Nogarole may refer to:

- Nogarole Rocca, Italian municipality of the province of Verona
- Nogarole Vicentino, Italian municipality of the province of Vicenza
