= San Giovanni Ilarione =

- Comune
- Comune di San Giovanni Ilarione
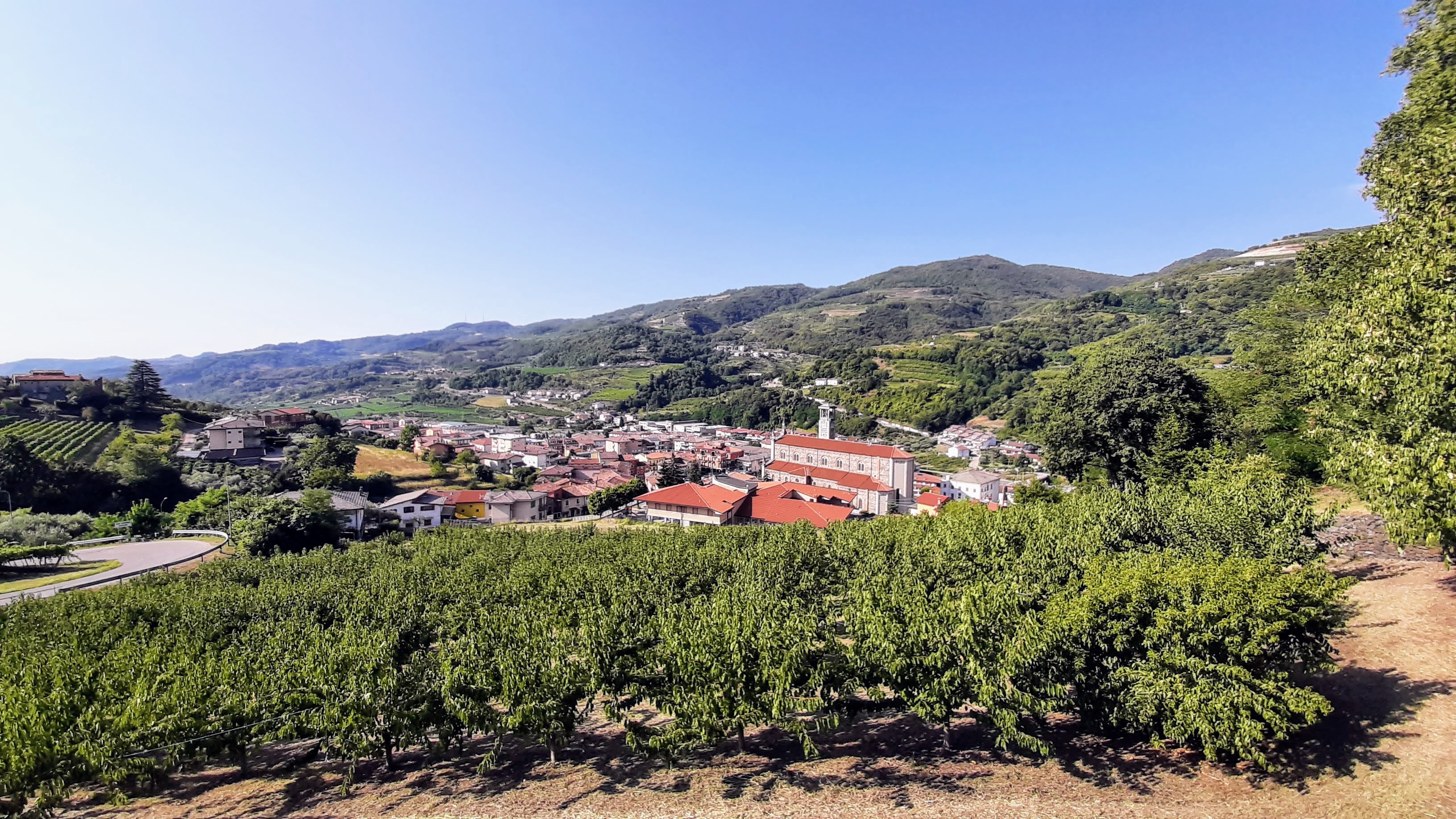

- Location within Italy Location within Veneto
- Coordinates: 45°31′N 11°14′E
- Country: Italy
- Region: Veneto
- Province: Verona (VR)
- Frazioni: Castello, Cattignano

Government
  - Mayor: Luciano Marcazzan (Action, elected with a civic list: Paese vivo)

Area
  - Total: 25.3 km^{2} (9.8 sq mi)
- Elevation: 194 m (636 ft)

Population (31 December 2015)
  - Total: 5,113
  - Density: 202/km^{2} (523/sq mi)
- Demonym: Ilarionesi
- Time zone: UTC+1 (CET)
  - Summer (DST): UTC+2 (CEST)
- Postal code: 37035
- Dialing code: 045
- Website: Official website

San Giovanni Ilarione is a comune (municipality) in the Province of Verona in the Italian region Veneto, located about 90 kilometres (56 mi) west of Venice and about 20 kilometres (12 mi) northeast of Verona.

San Giovanni Ilarione borders the following municipalities: Cazzano di Tramigna, Chiampo, Montecchia di Crosara, Roncà, Tregnago, and Vestenanova.

The parish church is San Giovanni Battista.
