= San Giovanni Battista, San Giovanni Ilarione =

Church building in San Giovanni Ilarione, Italy

Coordinates: 45.527211°N 11.237189°E

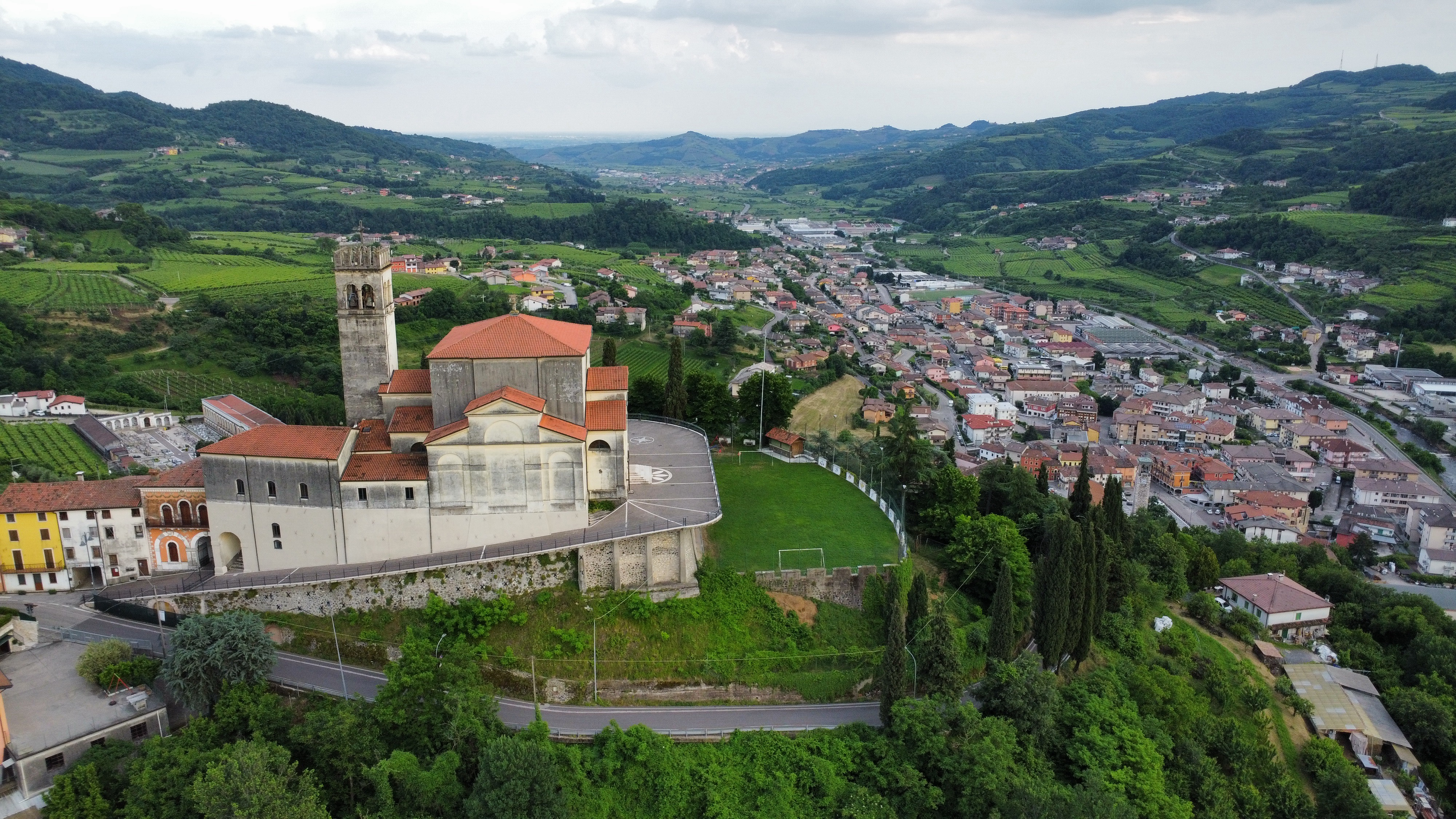
The Church of San Giovanni Battista

San Giovanni Battista is a Roman Catholic parish church, located in San Giovanni Ilarione, province of Verona, region of Veneto, Italy.

== History ==
The medieval church at this site was initially built within the protection of a castle. It was rebuilt over the centuries, including a consecration in 1525. The present church and bell-tower were completed between 1808 and 1812. The layout is that of a Greek cross with a single nave. The main altarpiece depicts an Enthroned Madonna and Child between Saints Anthony of Padua and John the Evangelist (1486) by Bartolomeo Montagna. A lightning bolt damaged the church, collapsing the bell-tower. The damage has subsequently been repaired.
