= Sant'Andrea Apostolo, Crespadoro =

Baroque church in Crespadoro, Vicenza, Italy

Coordinates: 45°35′42.1″N 11°9′3.7″E

Sant'Andrea Apostolo is a baroque-style, Roman Catholic parish church located on a hillside in Crespadoro, province of Vicenza, region of Veneto, Italy.

== History ==
A church at the site, dependent on the church of Santa Maria Assunta e San Martino located in Chiampo, is documented since 1297-1303. During the 14th and 15th centuries, it was a parish church for a Germanic population of the area. Construction of the present church took place in 1635-1652.
