= Caltrano =

- Comune
- Comune di Caltrano
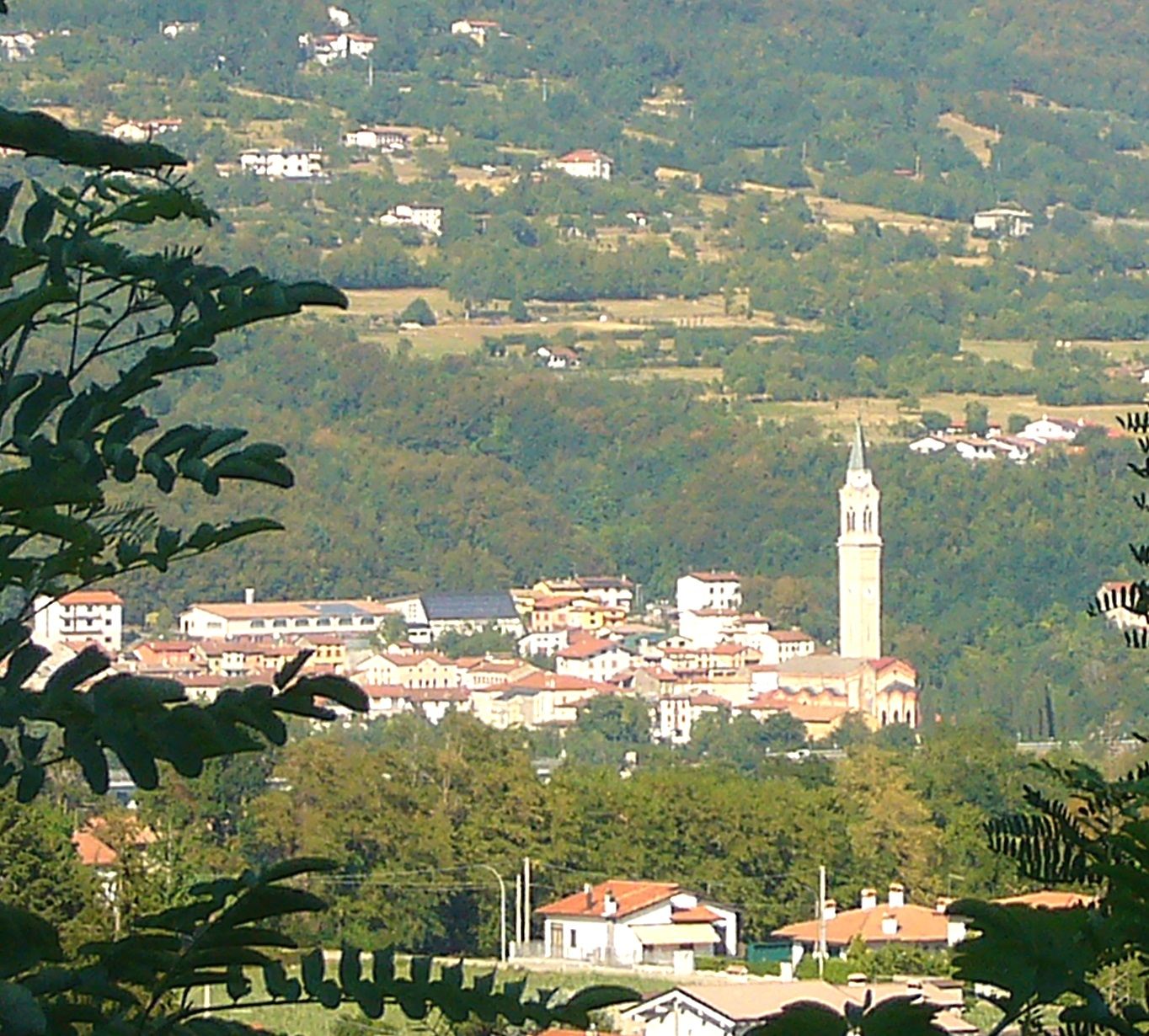

- Location within Italy Location within Veneto
- Coordinates: 45°46′N 11°28′E
- Country: Italy
- Region: Veneto
- Province: Vicenza (VI)
- Frazioni: Camisino, San Donà, Tezze, Campora, Maglio

Government
  - Mayor: Marco Sandonà

Area
  - Total: 22 km^{2} (8.5 sq mi)
- Elevation: 260 m (850 ft)

Population (30 April 2017)
  - Total: 2,523
  - Density: 110/km^{2} (300/sq mi)
- Demonym: Caltranesi
- Time zone: UTC+1 (CET)
  - Summer (DST): UTC+2 (CEST)
- Postal code: 36030
- Dialing code: 0445
- Patron saint: San Biagio
- Saint day: 3 February - 21 November
- Website: Official website

Caltrano is a town in the province of Vicenza, Veneto, northern Italy. It is east of SP351 provincial road.
