= Salcedo, Veneto =

Salcedo
- Comune
- Comune di Salcedo
- Location within Italy Location within Veneto
- Coordinates: 45°46′N 11°34′E
- Country: Italy
- Region: Veneto
- Province: Vicenza (VI)
- Frazioni: Laverda

Area
  - Total: 6 km^{2} (2.3 sq mi)
- Elevation: 398 m (1,306 ft)

Population (2018-01-01)
  - Total: 1,024
  - Density: 170/km^{2} (440/sq mi)
- Demonym: Salcedensi
- Time zone: UTC+1 (CET)
  - Summer (DST): UTC+2 (CEST)
- Postal code: 36040
- Dialing code: 0445
- ISTAT code: 024090
- Patron saint: Sant'Anna
- Saint day: 26 July
- Website: Official website

Salcedo is a town in the province of Vicenza, Veneto, Italy. It is southwest of SP72.

== Overview ==
The town of Salcedo has an approximate population of 1,021 people were 514 are males and 507 are females. The approximate number of families is around 394 with a total of around 495 housing units. The population is most commonly known as the Salcedensi and their Patron Saint is Sant'Anna. The zip code is 36040 and the elevation is of 280 metres (919 ft).
