= Monteviale =

- Comune
- Comune di Monteviale
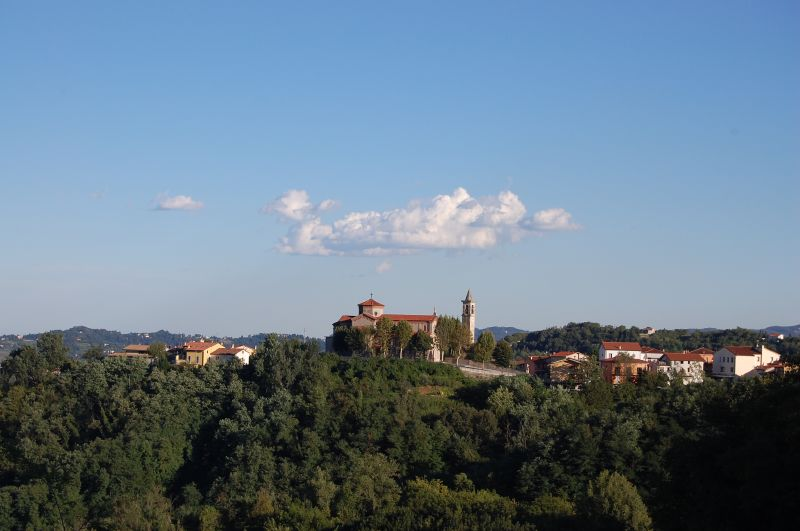
- View of Monteviale

- Location within Italy Location within Veneto
- Coordinates: 45°34′N 11°28′E
- Country: Italy
- Region: Veneto
- Province: Vicenza (VI)
- Frazioni: Costigiola

Government
  - Mayor: Elisa Santucci

Area
  - Total: 2,789 km^{2} (1,077 sq mi)

Population (31 December 2015)
  - Total: 2,811
  - Density: 1.008/km^{2} (2.610/sq mi)
- Demonym: Montevialesi
- Time zone: UTC+1 (CET)
  - Summer (DST): UTC+2 (CEST)
- Postal code: 36050
- Dialing code: 0444
- Patron saint: Assumption of Mary
- Saint day: 15 August
- Website: Official website

Monteviale is a town and comune in the province of Vicenza, Veneto, northern Italy.
