= Velo d'Astico =

- Comune
- Comune di Velo d'Astico
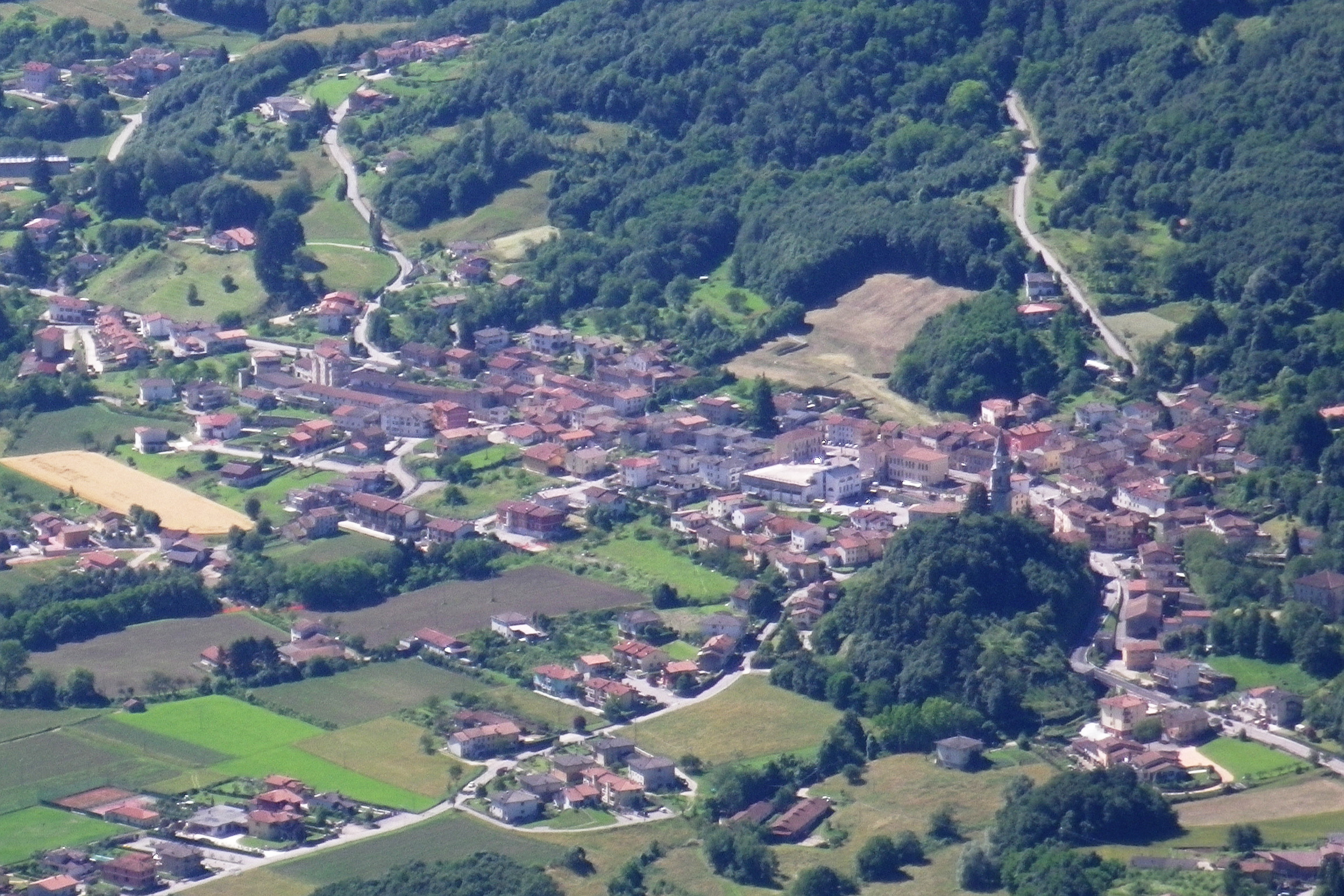
- View of Velo d'Astico

- Location within Italy Location within Veneto
- Coordinates: 45°47′N 11°22′E
- Country: Italy
- Region: Veneto
- Province: Vicenza (VI)
- Frazioni: Lago, Meda, Seghe

Government
  - Mayor: Giordano Rossi

Area
  - Total: 21.9 km^{2} (8.5 sq mi)
- Elevation: 346 m (1,135 ft)

Population (31 December 2015)
  - Total: 2,403
  - Density: 110/km^{2} (284/sq mi)
- Demonym: Velesi
- Time zone: UTC+1 (CET)
  - Summer (DST): UTC+2 (CEST)
- Postal code: 36010
- Dialing code: 0445
- Website: Official website

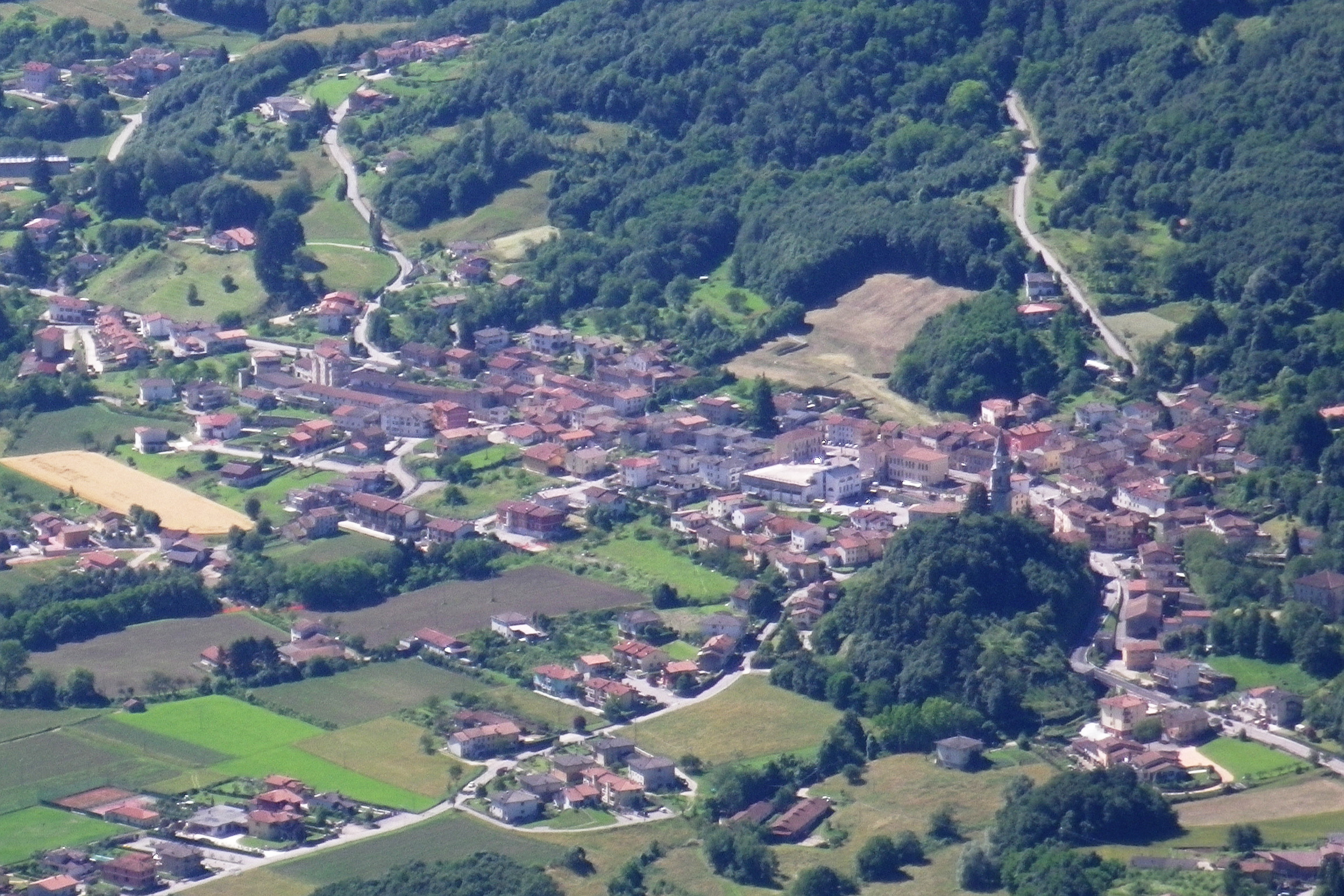
Velo d'Astico in spring

Velo d'Astico is a town in the province of Vicenza, Veneto, Italy. It is west of SP350 provincial road.

== Sources ==
- (Google Maps)
