= Lastebasse =

- Comune
- Comune di Lastebasse
- Location within Italy Location within Veneto
- Coordinates: 45°54′56″N 11°16′17″E
- Country: Italy
- Region: Veneto
- Province: Vicenza (VI)
- Frazioni: Posta, Montepiano

Area
  - Total: 18 km^{2} (6.9 sq mi)
- Elevation: 585 m (1,919 ft)

Population (2018-01-01)
  - Total: 241
  - Density: 13/km^{2} (35/sq mi)
- Time zone: UTC+1 (CET)
  - Summer (DST): UTC+2 (CEST)
- Postal code: 36040
- Dialing code: 0445
- ISTAT code: 024050

Lastebasse is a town in the province of Vicenza, Veneto, Italy. It is on SP350. As of 2007 Lastebasse had an estimated population of 247.

== Sources ==
- (Google Maps)
