= Calvene =

- Comune
- Comune di Calvene
- Location within Italy Location within Veneto
- Coordinates: 45°46′N 11°31′E
- Country: Italy
- Region: Veneto
- Province: Vicenza (VI)
- Frazioni: [Monte]

Area
  - Total: 11 km^{2} (4.2 sq mi)
- Elevation: 210 m (690 ft)

Population (2018-01-01)
  - Total: 1,273
  - Density: 120/km^{2} (300/sq mi)
- Demonym: Calvenesi
- Time zone: UTC+1 (CET)
  - Summer (DST): UTC+2 (CEST)
- Postal code: 36030
- Dialing code: 0445
- ISTAT code: 024020
- Patron saint: Santa Maria dell'Annunciazione
- Saint day: 25 March
- Website: Official website

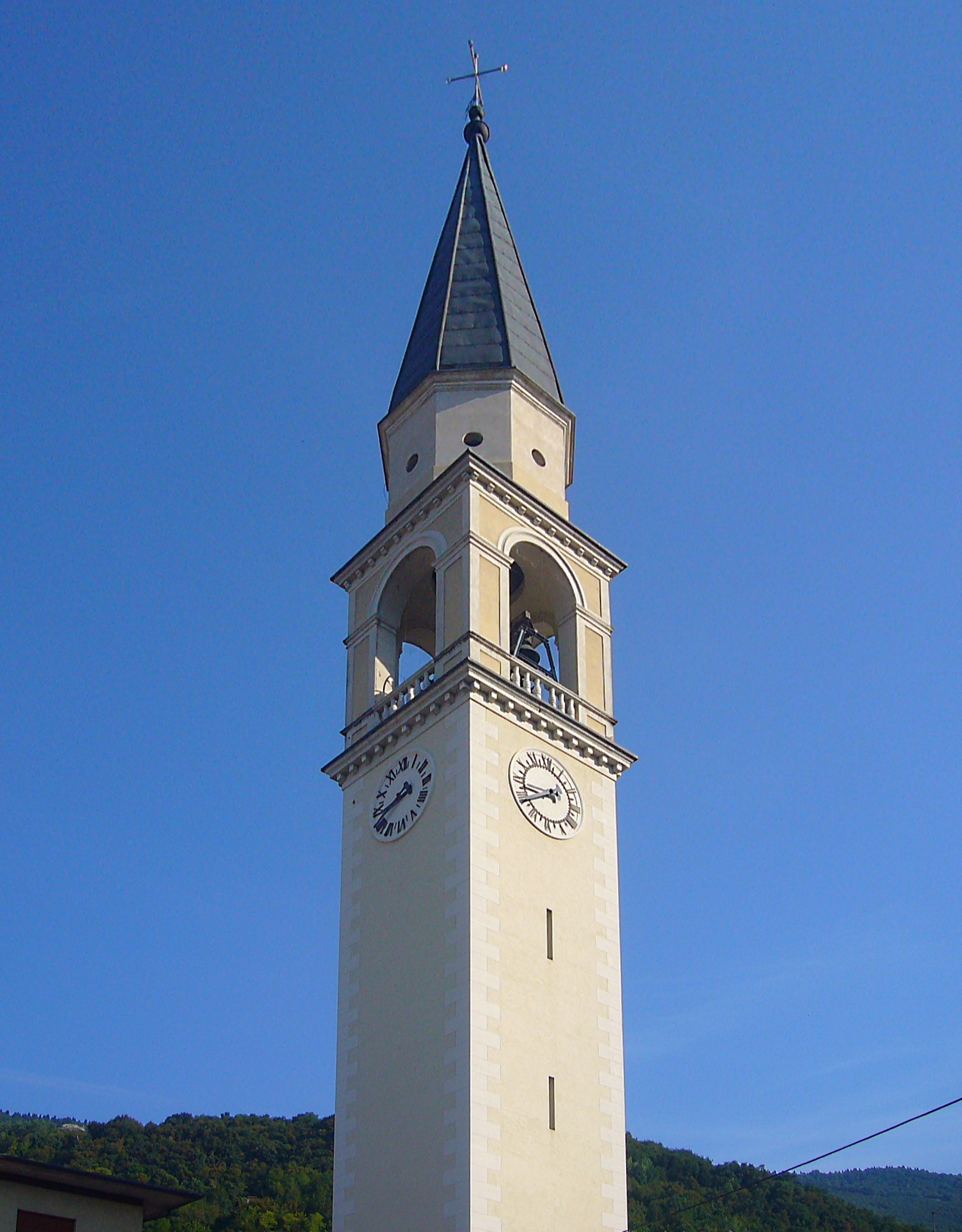
The bell tower of Calvene.

Calvene is a town in the province of Vicenza, Veneto, Italy. It is east of SP349. The population has remained relatively stable throughout the years. The most recent census showed 1324 inhabitants.
