= Zovencedo =

- Comune
- Comune di Zovencedo
- Location within Italy Location within Veneto
- Coordinates: 45°26′N 11°30′E
- Country: Italy
- Region: Veneto
- Province: Vicenza (VI)
- Frazioni: San Gottardo

Government
  - Mayor: Luigina Crivellaro

Area
  - Total: 9 km^{2} (3.5 sq mi)
- Elevation: 276 m (906 ft)

Population (31 December 2015)
  - Total: 773
  - Density: 86/km^{2} (220/sq mi)
- Demonym: Zovencedesi
- Time zone: UTC+1 (CET)
  - Summer (DST): UTC+2 (CEST)
- Postal code: 36020
- Dialing code: 0444
- Website: Official website

Zovencedo is a town in the province of Vicenza, Veneto, north-eastern Italy. It is west of SP247 provincial road.
