= Montebello Vicentino =

- Comune
- Comune di Montebello Vicentino
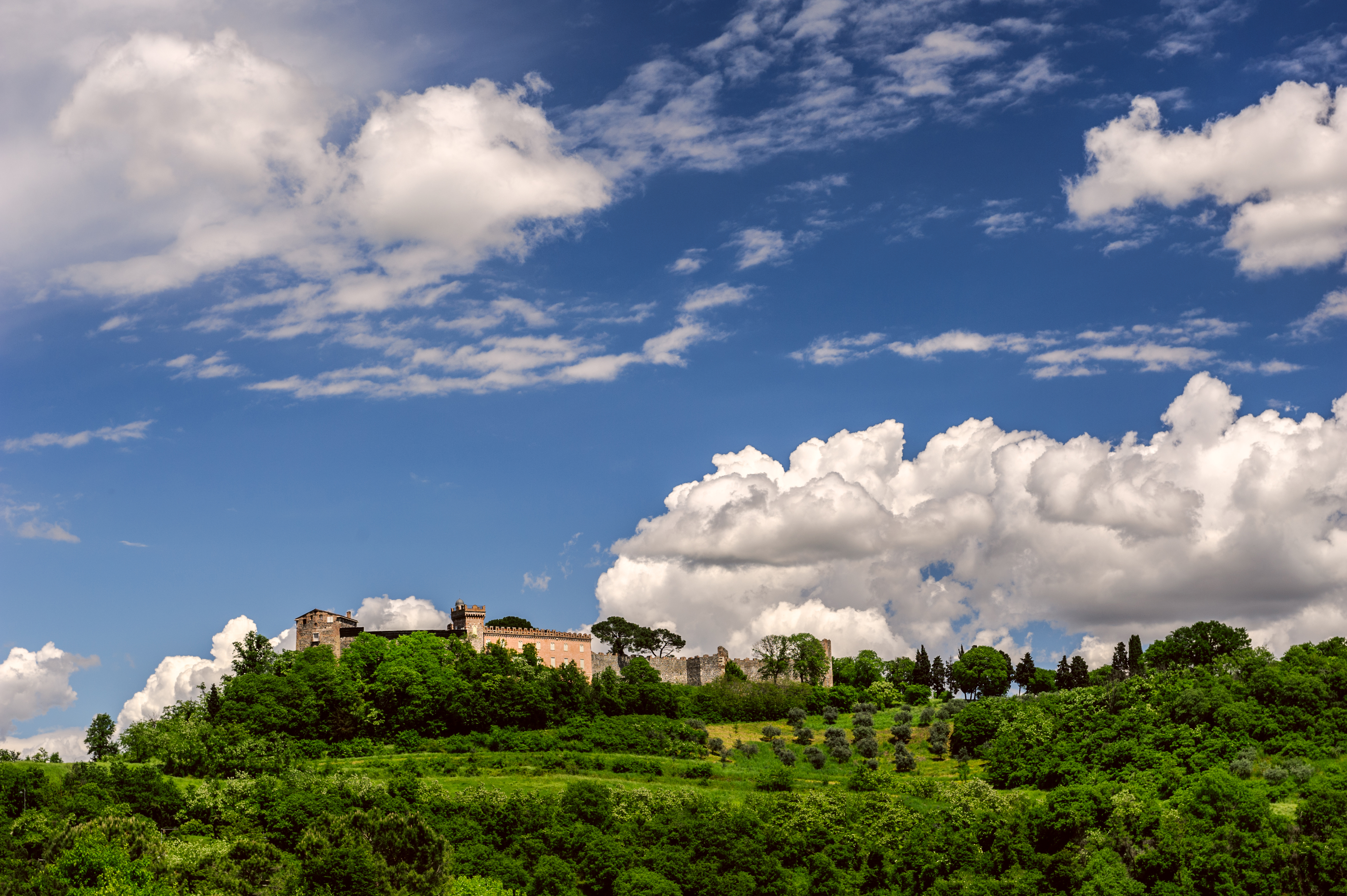
- View of Castle of Maltraveri

- Coat of arms

- Location within Italy Location within Veneto
- Coordinates: 45°27′N 11°23′E
- Country: Italy
- Region: Veneto
- Province: Vicenza
- Frazioni: Bacino del Guà, Selva, Agugliana, Mason, Ca' Sordis

Government
  - Mayor: Dino Magnabosco (UDC)

Area
  - Total: 21.48 km^{2} (8.29 sq mi)
- Elevation: 48 m (157 ft)

Population (30 November 2017)
  - Total: 6,544
  - Density: 304.7/km^{2} (789.1/sq mi)
- Demonym: Montebellani
- Time zone: UTC+1 (CET)
  - Summer (DST): UTC+2 (CEST)
- Postal code: 36054
- Dialing code: 0444
- Patron saint: St. John
- Saint day: June 24
- Website: Official website

Montebello Vicentino (Montebeło in veneto) is a town and comune of 6332 inhabitants in the province of Vicenza, Veneto, northern Italy. It is west of the SP31 provincial road.

== Physical Geography ==
Montebello Vicentino is located in the province of Vicenza, on the border with the province of Verona. The municipality lies at the foothills of the Lessini Mountains, at the entrance to the Chiampo Valley, and is also not far from the Berici Hills. It is crossed by the Chiampo stream, the Guà River, and the Acquetta stream.

== Territory ==
Montebello Vicentino forms part of a wider agricultural and viticultural landscape characteristic of the western province of Vicenza. The municipality benefits from soils of volcanic and alluvial origin and a temperate climate well suited to vine cultivation. The area lies near important wine districts such as the Soave zone and the Gambellara appellation centered on Gambellara, both historically associated with Garganega-based white wines. Its proximity to the Colli Berici further situates the municipality within a broader network of vineyards producing both white and red varieties typical of the Veneto. This territorial context reflects a landscape shaped by centuries of agricultural activity, where viticulture represents a defining economic and cultural element of the local identity.

== Infrastructure and transport ==
=== Roads ===
The town is crossed by State Road 11

The A4 Turin-Trieste motorway passes through the municipality, with the Montebello Vicentino toll booth.

=== Railways ===
Montebello Station, on the Milan-Venice line

==== TAV Project in Montebello Vicentino ====
In early 2026, the municipality of Montebello Vicentino announced that several observations it had submitted regarding the High-Speed Rail (TAV) project had been incorporated into the final design, despite initial indications that they would not be accepted.

===== Station redevelopment =====
The municipal administration had raised concerns about the condition of the existing railway station, citing structural aging and deterioration. The municipality also requested a review of related public service areas, including parking facilities. Although initial responses suggested that no interventions were planned, the final project documentation provided by Rete Ferroviaria Italiana (RFI) included a comprehensive redevelopment plan.

The approved design concerns the demolition of the existing station building and the construction of a new elevated station structure.

== Origins of the Name ==
According to the most reliable interpretation, ad aureos montes was the name of the settlement, as it appears in the Antonine Itinerary. Through successive transformations of this expression, its original meaning was preserved: Montebello would therefore literally mean “beautiful mountain.”

This contrasts with another theory, which claims that Montebello derives from mons belli (“mountain of war”). However, it is unclear which specific war such a name would have referred to.

== History ==
=== Pre-Roman and Roman Period ===
Evidence of pre-Roman settlements in Montebello comes from Paleovenetic tombs found in the area, linked to the ancient Veneti culture centered in Este around the 8th century BC. The region was later inhabited by the Cenomani Gauls during the La Tène period (5th century BC). Its location along the Via Gallica boosted early development.

In Roman times, Montebello gained importance thanks to the Via Postumia, the consular road connecting Genoa to Aquileia from 148 BC. A rest and horse-changing station called Mutatio Aureos stood here, in the area known today as Mason. The name likely evolved from mansio.

The site later became a Templar commandery, linked to the Knights Templar and their support of pilgrims traveling to the Holy Land along the Itinerarium Burdigalense. Remains of the complex still exist, including vaulted cellars, stone buttresses, a well, a keystone carved with the Templar cross, and a Roman milestone. An inventory from 1310 documents the property shortly after the suppression of the Templar Order in 1307.

=== From the Middle Ages to the Risorgimento ===
After the fall of the Roman Empire, the area passed under Gothic, Lombard, and Frankish control. Between the 11th and 13th centuries it was ruled by the Maltraverso family, then ceded to Vicenza.

In the 14th century it fell under the Scaligeri of Verona during their expansion, becoming a hotspot in regional conflicts involving Padua, Milan, and Venice. It was annexed to the Republic of Venice in the early 15th century and remained under Venetian rule until Napoleon dissolved the Republic in 1797.

Napoleon himself stayed in Montebello during the Italian campaign, though the locals were not exactly thrilled about it. The town later passed to Austrian control in 1813.

A key event was the Battle of Sorio on April 8, 1848, during the Italian Risorgimento. Around 2,200 poorly armed Italian student volunteers, many from the University of Padua, clashed with 3,000 Austrian troops. The Austrians prevailed, leaving about 50 volunteers dead. A memorial spire in Sorio commemorates them.

=== From the Risorgimento to the Present ===
In 1866, Veneto was annexed to the Kingdom of Italy, and Montebello officially became Montebello Vicentino to distinguish it from other towns with the same name.

World War I claimed many local lives, later honored with a monument. General Giuseppe Vaccari, who led resistance along the Piave River, was born here.

Fascism brought political stability but real economic recovery came only after World War II. Following the Armistice of September 8, 1943, German forces dug defensive trenches in the town, later overrun by Allied tanks. On October 15, 1944, Allied aircraft dropped 183 bombs targeting the railway bridge, but nearby districts were heavily hit instead.

Postwar years saw emigration, followed by the economic boom of northeastern Italy, bringing prosperity but also pollution and heavy urbanization. Today, Montebello attracts immigrants mainly from North Africa, Ghana, Bangladesh, Sri Lanka, and, to a lesser extent, Eastern Europe.

== Sources ==
- (Google Maps)
