= Crespadoro =

- Comune
- Comune di Crespadoro
- Location within Italy Location within Veneto
- Coordinates: 45°37′N 11°14′E
- Country: Italy
- Region: Veneto
- Province: Vicenza (VI)
- Frazioni: Campodalbero, Durlo, Marana

Government
  - Mayor: Emanuela Del Cengio

Area
  - Total: 30 km^{2} (12 sq mi)
- Elevation: 363 m (1,191 ft)

Population (30 June 2017)
  - Total: 1,321
  - Density: 44/km^{2} (110/sq mi)
- Demonym: Crespadoresi
- Time zone: UTC+1 (CET)
  - Summer (DST): UTC+2 (CEST)
- Postal code: 36070
- Dialing code: 0444
- Website: Official website

Crespadoro is a town in the province of Vicenza, Veneto, north-eastern Italy. It is north of SP31 provincial road, in the Chiampo Valley of the Venetian Prealps.

It is the site of the 17th-century church, Sant'Andrea Apostolo, Crespadoro and the 18th-century oratory, Oratorio di San Matio o della Pozza.
