= Laghi, Veneto =

Laghi
- Comune
- Comune di Laghi
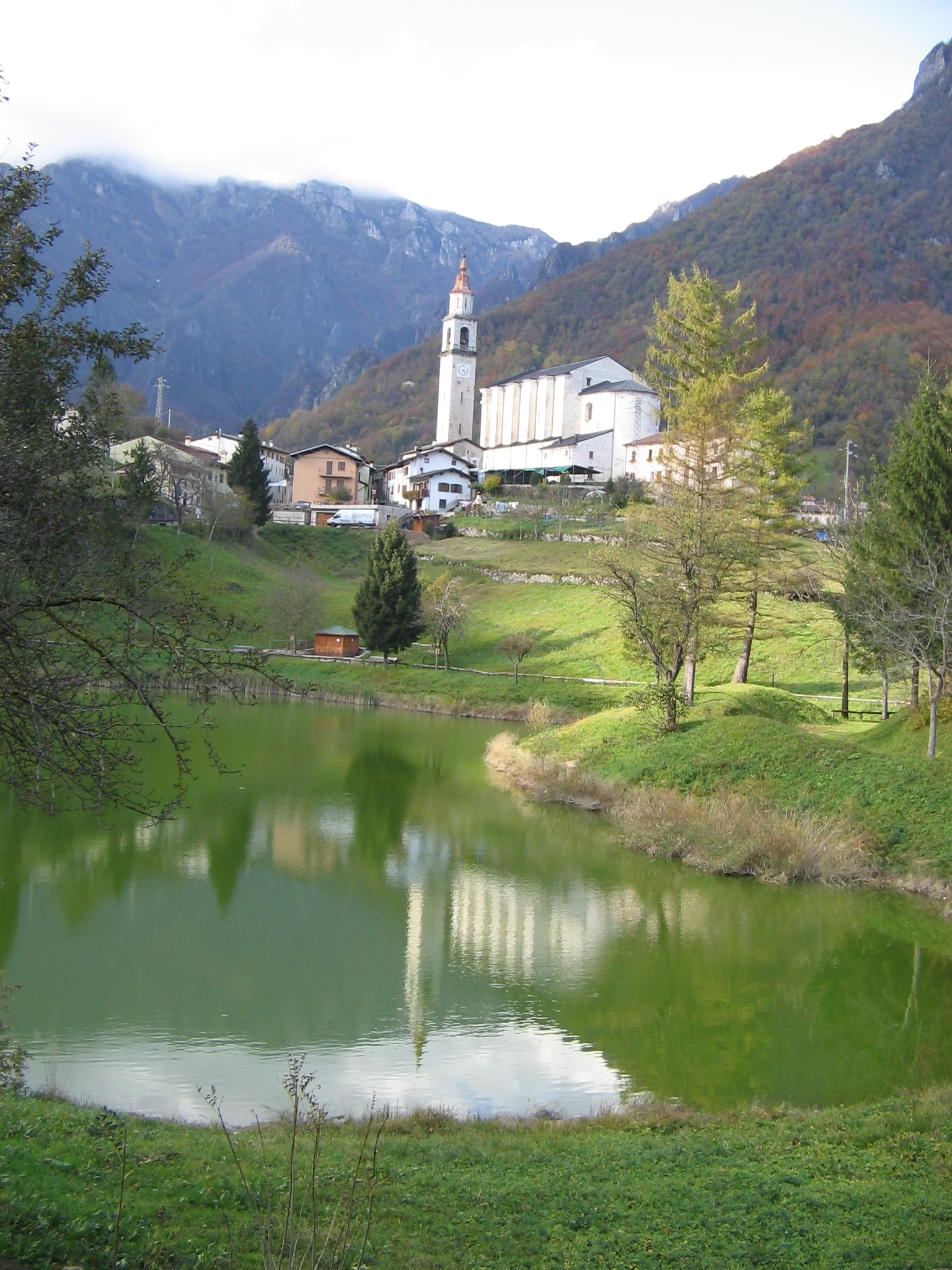
- View of Laghi

- Location within Italy Location within Veneto
- Coordinates: 45°49′25″N 11°16′23″E
- Country: Italy
- Region: Veneto
- Province: Vicenza (VI)

Government
  - Mayor: Ferrulio Angelo Lorenzato

Area
  - Total: 22.22 km^{2} (8.58 sq mi)
- Elevation: 570 m (1,870 ft)

Population (31 August 2017)
  - Total: 129
  - Density: 5.81/km^{2} (15.0/sq mi)
- Demonym: Laghesi
- Time zone: UTC+1 (CET)
  - Summer (DST): UTC+2 (CEST)
- Postal code: 36010
- Dialing code: 0445
- Patron saint: St. Barnabas
- Website: Official website

Laghi is a town and a comune in the province of Vicenza, Veneto, north-eastern Italy. It is west of SP350 provincial road. Laghi is Veneto's municipality with the smallest number of inhabitants and also the one with the lowest density. The municipality consists of a number of small hamlets (contrae in Venetian, or contrade in Italian) scattered over the territory of the town. The name Laghi literally means "lakes" and is related to the fact that two small lakes lie in the center of the town.
