= San Pietro Mussolino =

- Comune
- Comune di San Pietro Mussolino
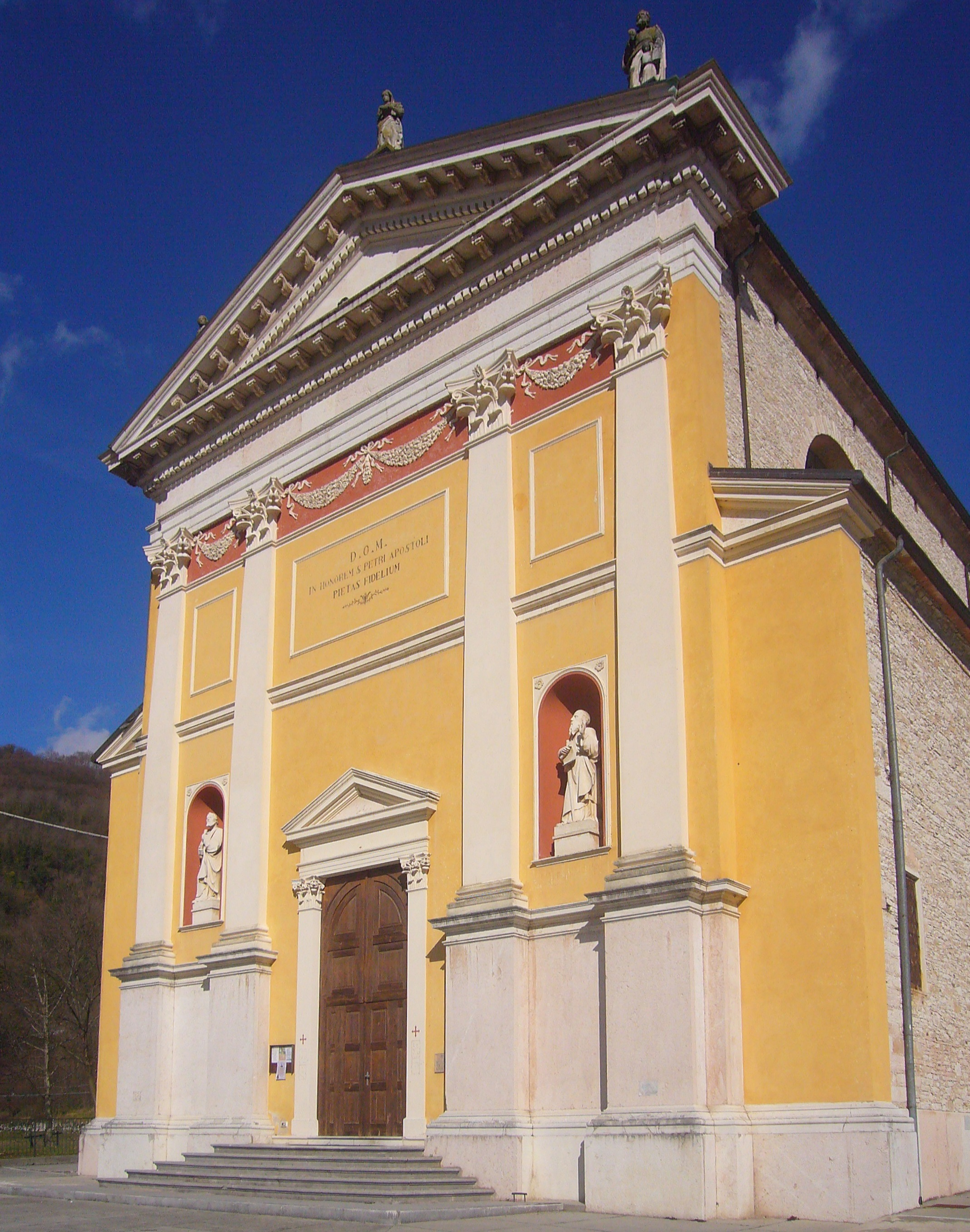
- Chiesa di San Pietro Apostolo, San Pietro Mussolino

- Location within Italy Location within Veneto
- Coordinates: 45°35′N 11°15′E
- Country: Italy
- Region: Veneto
- Province: Vicenza (VI)
- Frazioni: Mussolino, San Pietro Vecchio

Area
  - Total: 4 km^{2} (1.5 sq mi)
- Elevation: 270 m (890 ft)

Population (30 June 2008)
  - Total: 1,618
  - Density: 400/km^{2} (1,000/sq mi)
- Time zone: UTC+1 (CET)
  - Summer (DST): UTC+2 (CEST)
- Postal code: 36070
- Dialing code: 0444
- ISTAT code: 024094
- Website: Official website

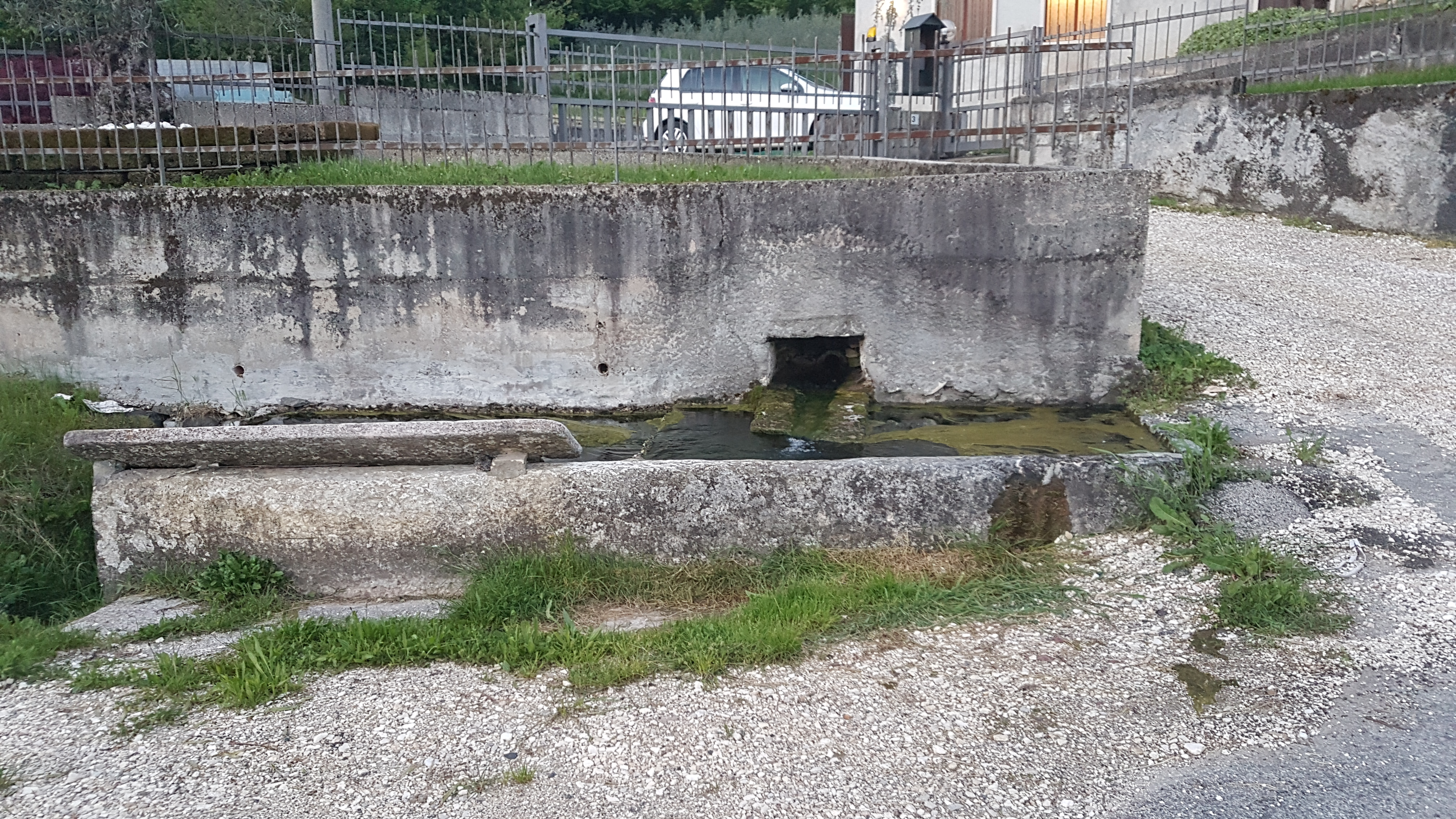
Fontana ai Dugatti

San Pietro Mussolino is a town in the province of Vicenza, Veneto, Italy. SP31 and SP44 goes through it.

== Sources ==
- (Google Maps)
