= Villaga =

- Comune
- Comune di Villaga
- Coat of arms

- Location within Italy Location within Veneto
- Coordinates: 45°24′N 11°32′E
- Country: Italy
- Region: Veneto
- Province: Vicenza (VI)
- Frazioni: Belvedere, Pozzolo, Toara

Government
  - Mayor: Eugenio Gonzato

Area
  - Total: 23 km^{2} (8.9 sq mi)
- Elevation: 45 m (148 ft)

Population (31 December 2015)
  - Total: 1,914
  - Density: 83/km^{2} (220/sq mi)
- Demonym: Villaghesi
- Time zone: UTC+1 (CET)
  - Summer (DST): UTC+2 (CEST)
- Postal code: 36021
- Dialing code: 0444
- Website: Official website

Villaga is a town in the province of Vicenza, Veneto, northern Italy. It is northwest of SP8 provincial road.
