= Nogarole Vicentino =

- Comune
- Comune di Nogarole Vicentino
- Location within Italy Location within Veneto
- Coordinates: 45°34′N 11°17′E
- Country: Italy
- Region: Veneto
- Province: Vicenza (VI)
- Frazioni: Alvese

Area
  - Total: 9 km^{2} (3.5 sq mi)

Population (28 February 2007)
  - Total: 1,089
  - Density: 120/km^{2} (310/sq mi)
- Time zone: UTC+1 (CET)
  - Summer (DST): UTC+2 (CEST)
- Postal code: 36070
- Dialing code: 0444
- ISTAT code: 024072

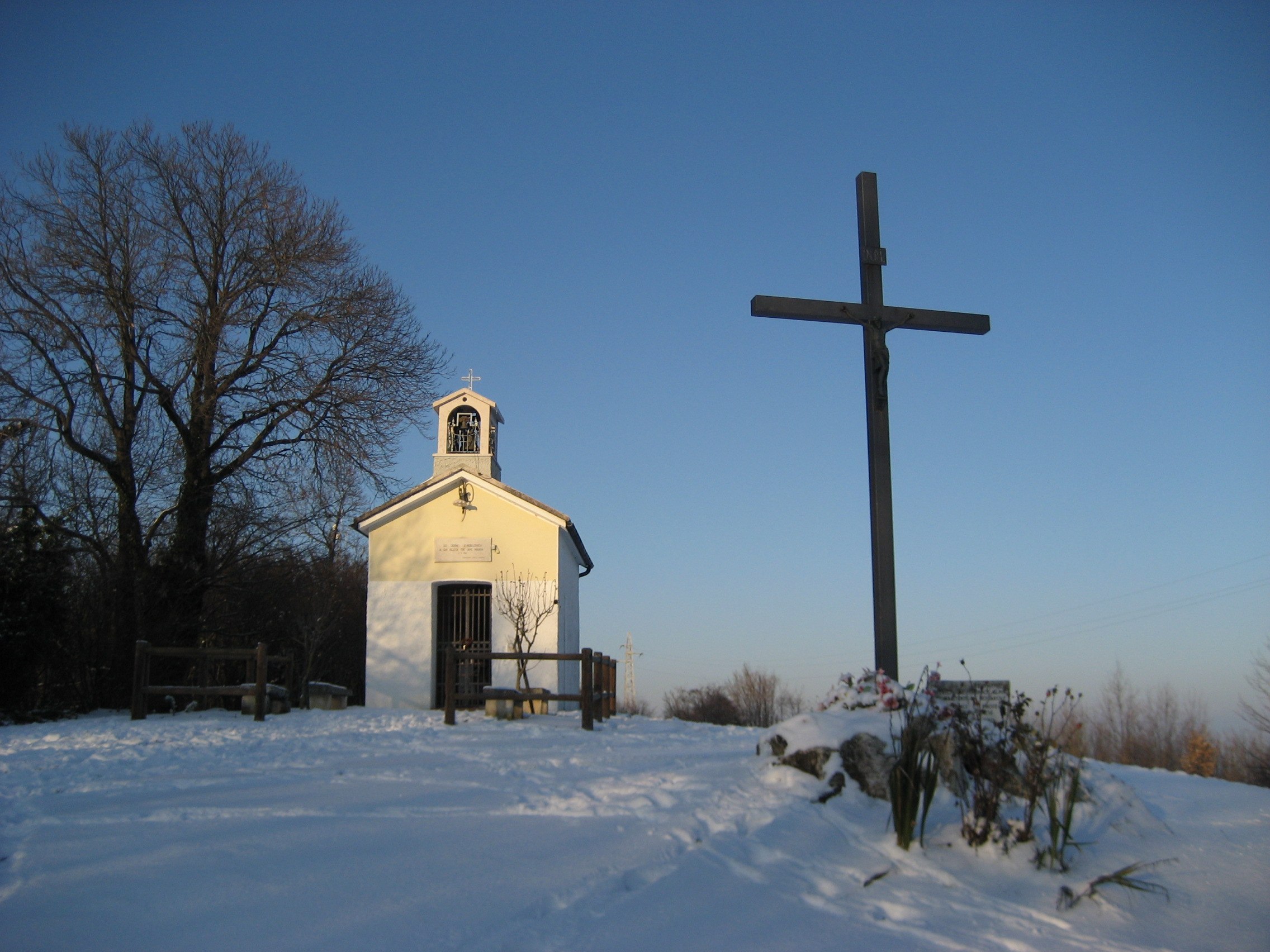
Small Church of Faldo di Nogarole

Nogarole Vicentino is a town and comune in the province of Vicenza, Veneto, Italy. It is east of SP43.

== Sources ==
- (Google Maps)
