= Montorso Vicentino =

- Comune
- Comune di Montorso Vicentino
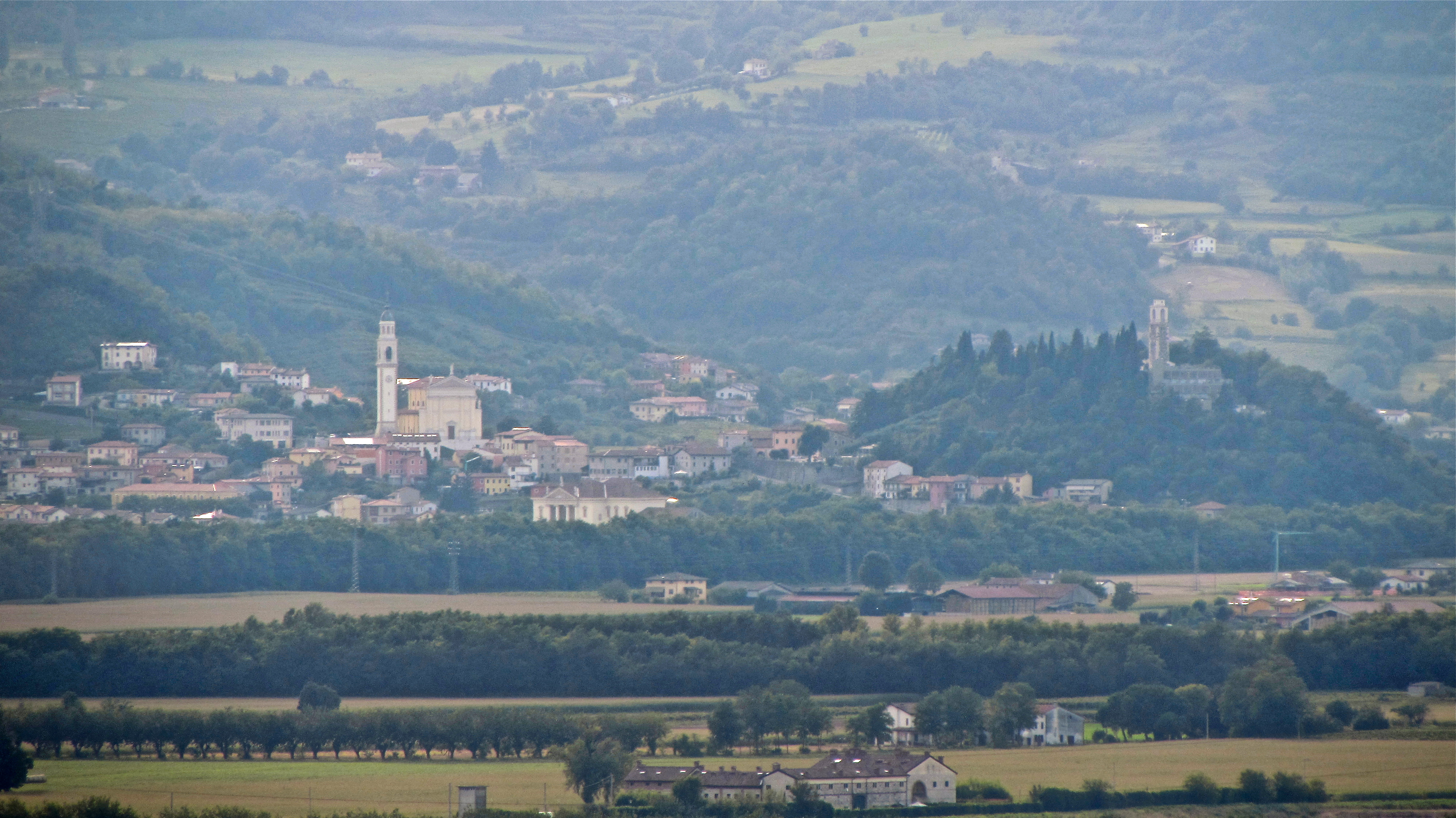
- View of Montorso Vicentino

- Location within Italy Location within Veneto
- Coordinates: 45°29′N 11°22′E
- Country: Italy
- Region: Veneto
- Province: Vicenza (VI)
- Frazioni: Ponte Cocco

Area
  - Total: 9.29 km^{2} (3.59 sq mi)
- Elevation: 118 m (387 ft)

Population (30 November 2017)
  - Total: 3,090
  - Density: 333/km^{2} (861/sq mi)
- Demonym: Montorsani
- Time zone: UTC+1 (CET)
  - Summer (DST): UTC+2 (CEST)
- Postal code: 36050
- Dialing code: 0444
- Website: Official website

Montorso Vicentino is a town and comune in the province of Vicenza, Veneto, Italy. It is south of SP31 provincial road.

== Sources ==
- (Google Maps)
