= Altissimo, Veneto =

Altissimo
- Comune
- Comune di Altissimo
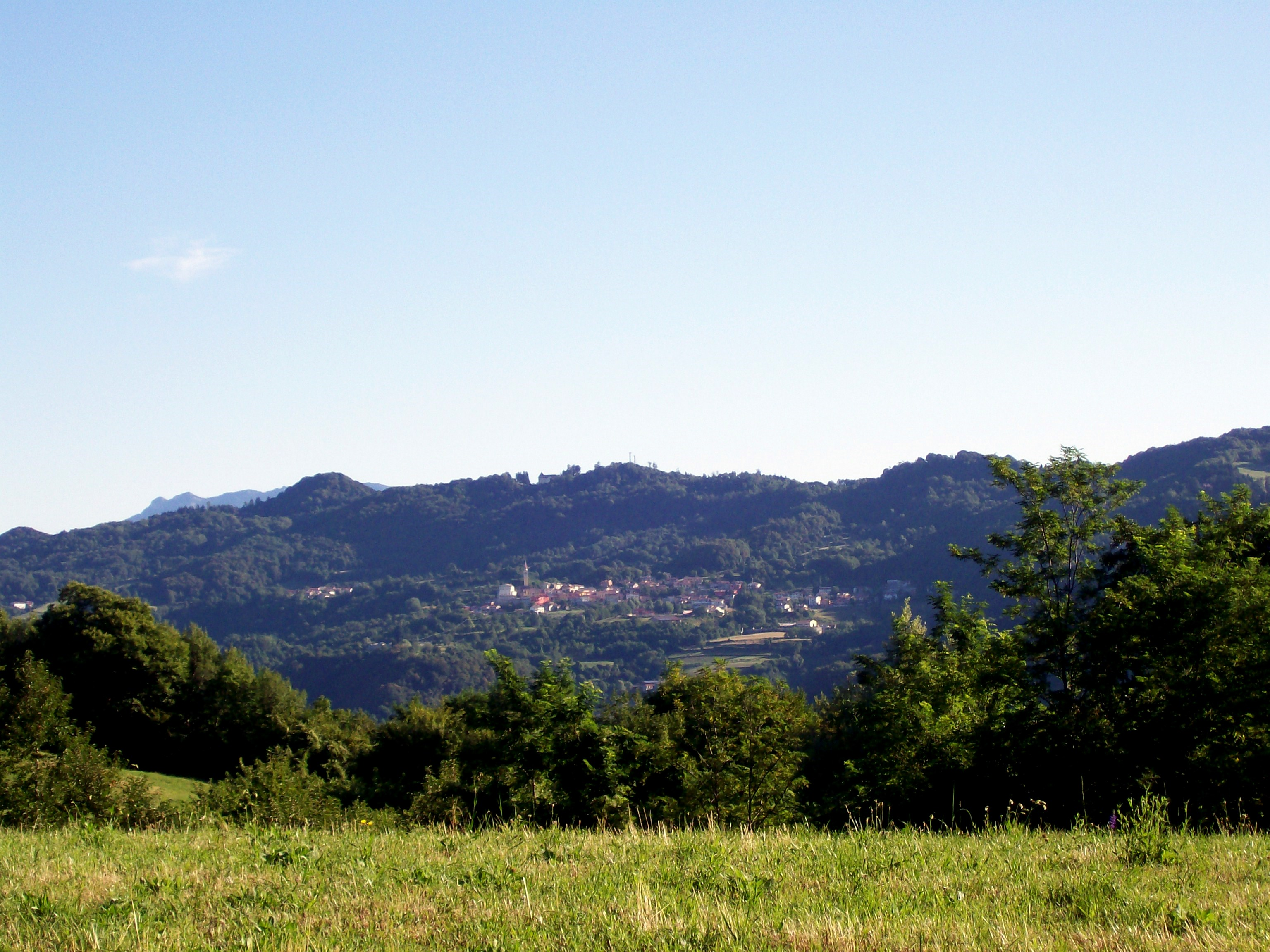
- View of Altissimo

- Location within Italy Location within Veneto
- Coordinates: 45°37′N 11°14′E
- Country: Italy
- Region: Veneto
- Province: Vicenza (VI)
- Frazioni: Campanella, Molino

Government
  - Mayor: Liliana Teresa Monchelato

Area
  - Total: 15.09 km^{2} (5.83 sq mi)
- Elevation: 115 m (377 ft)

Population (30 April 2017)
  - Total: 2,247
  - Density: 148.9/km^{2} (385.7/sq mi)
- Demonym: Altissimensi
- Time zone: UTC+1 (CET)
  - Summer (DST): UTC+2 (CEST)
- Postal code: 36070
- Dialing code: 0444
- Website: Official website

Altissimo is a comune (municipality) in the province of Vicenza, Veneto, Italy. It is located in the hills of Chiampo valley.

== History ==
Even though the civic and religious organization of the area must be placed earlier, the inhabited territory evolved in the 13th century following the colonization of ethnic German populations (the so-called Cimbri). On February 5, 1287, the Cimbrian Olderico da Altissimo signed a contract with Verona's bishop, Bartolomeo della Scala, to become steward of the area.

There is little information on the medieval period, and it largely pertains to the church of San Nicola and the districts of Molino and Costa; there is no evidence of castles.

Altissimo, together with Padua and Venice, fought against Mastino II della Scala in 1336. The Scaligeri were followed by the Visconti in 1387, and afterwards by the Republic of Venice (1404).

During the Serenissima's reign, the economy shifted from a subsistence economy based on small and medium-sized local proprietors to a profit economy dominated by nobles and bourgeois.

Altissimo became a municipality of the Lombardo-Veneto Kingdom after the Napoleonic period, located in the Arzignano district of the province of Vicenza, a condition that has largely been preserved to the current day.

The Second World War period is notable. Following Cassibile's armistice, the locals saved several disbanded soldiers going through the area. Furthermore, in the beginning of October 1943, the first partisan units emerged, with the assistance of many local families, despite the risk of Nazi-fascist retaliation. The town was traversed by retreating German forces in the days following the conflict's end: some were confronted and disarmed, while others ransacked houses and kidnapped hostages.
