= Zermeghedo =

- Comune
- Comune di Zermeghedo
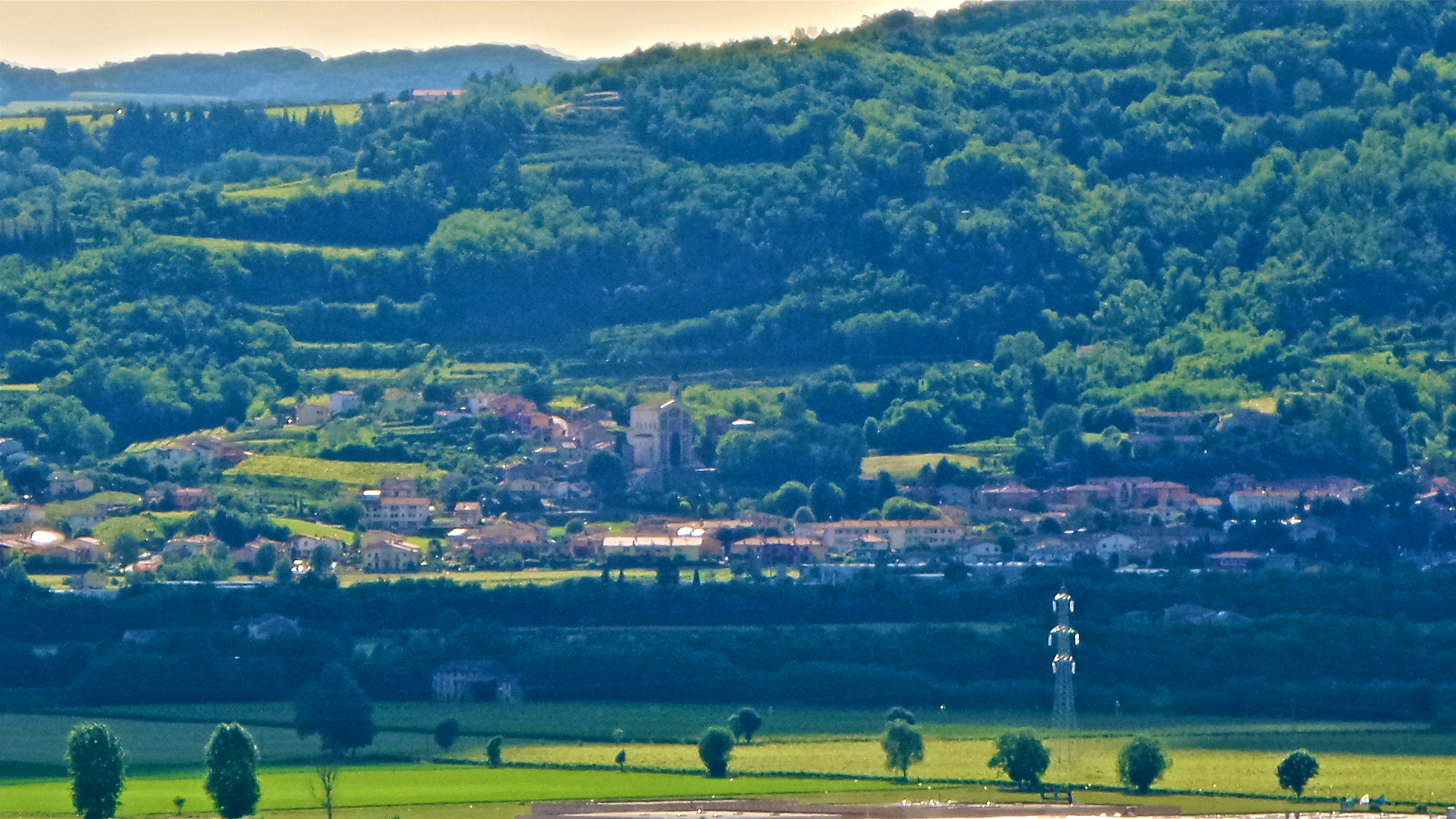
- View of Zermeghedo

- Coat of arms

- Location within Italy Location within Veneto
- Coordinates: 45°29′N 11°22′E
- Country: Italy
- Region: Veneto
- Province: Vicenza (VI)

Government
  - Mayor: Luca Albiero

Area
  - Total: 2.97 km^{2} (1.15 sq mi)
- Elevation: 84 m (276 ft)

Population (30 November 2020)
  - Total: 1,358
  - Density: 457/km^{2} (1,180/sq mi)
- Demonym: Zermeghedesi
- Time zone: UTC+1 (CET)
  - Summer (DST): UTC+2 (CEST)
- Postal code: 36050
- Dialing code: 0444
- Website: Official website

Zermeghedo is a town and comune in the province of Vicenza, Veneto, north-eastern Italy. It is west of SP31 provincial road. Zermeghedo is the comune with the smallest area in Veneto.
