= Trissino =

Trissino Trisino
- Comune
- Comune di Trissino
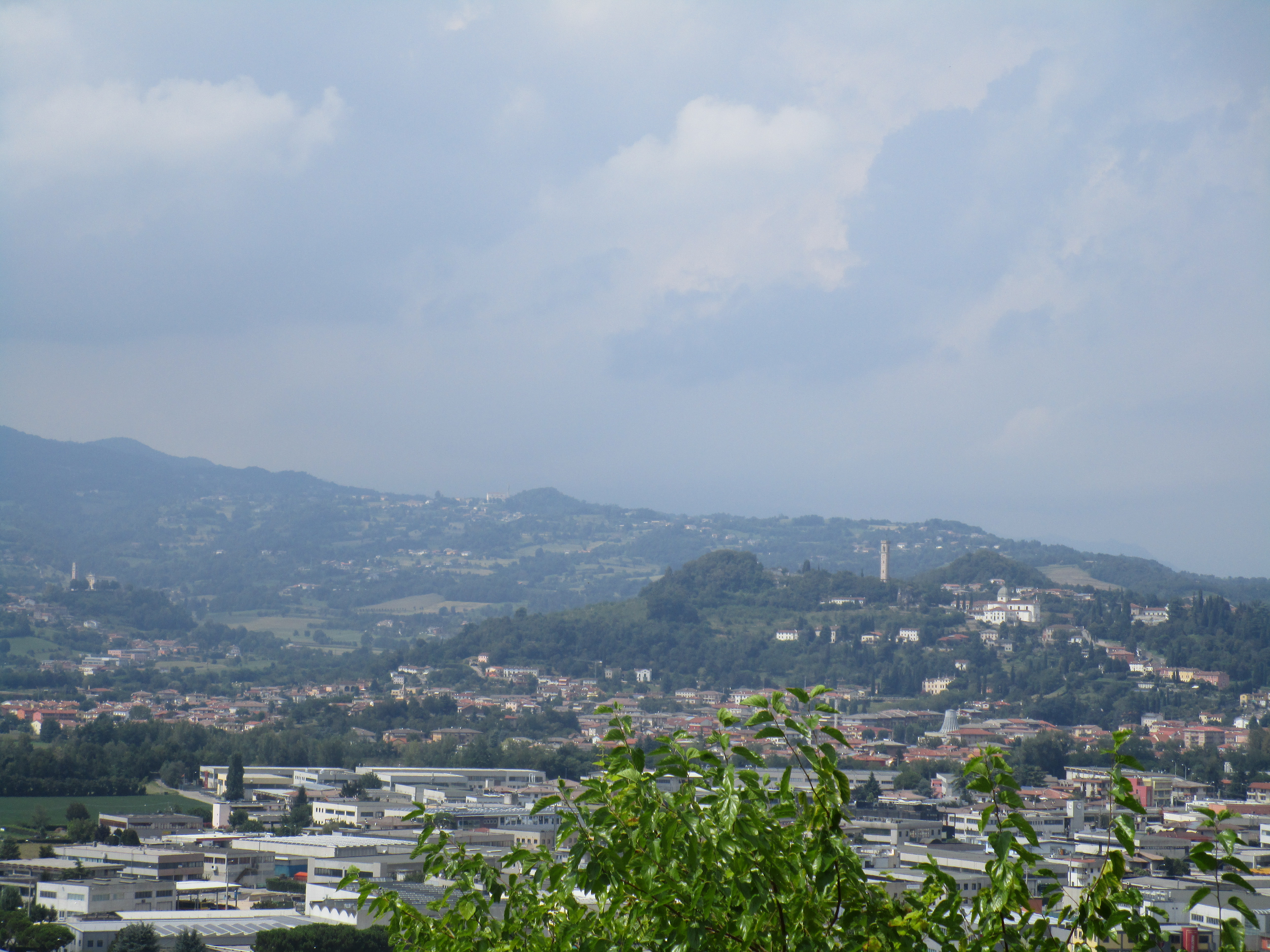
- View of Trissino

- Location within Italy Location within Veneto
- Coordinates: 45°34′N 11°22′E
- Country: Italy
- Region: Veneto
- Province: Vicenza (VI)
- Frazioni: Lovara, San Benedetto, Selva di Trissino

Area
  - Total: 21 km^{2} (8.1 sq mi)
- Elevation: 125 m (410 ft)

Population (January 2009)
  - Total: 8,528
  - Density: 410/km^{2} (1,100/sq mi)
- Time zone: UTC+1 (CET)
  - Summer (DST): UTC+2 (CEST)
- Postal code: 36070
- Dialing code: 0445
- ISTAT code: 024110
- Patron saint: Sant'Andrea
- Website: Official website

Trissino (Venetian: Trisino) is a comune in the province of Vicenza, in northern Italy. Its mayor is Davide Faccio (member of Lega Nord, right). The town is famous all over Italy for its hockey team, the Gruppo Sportivo Hockey Trissino.

== Twin towns ==
Trissino is twinned with:

- Neu-Ulm, Germany, since 1990

== See also ==
- Trissino family
