= Frazione =

Fourth-level administrative divisions of Italy

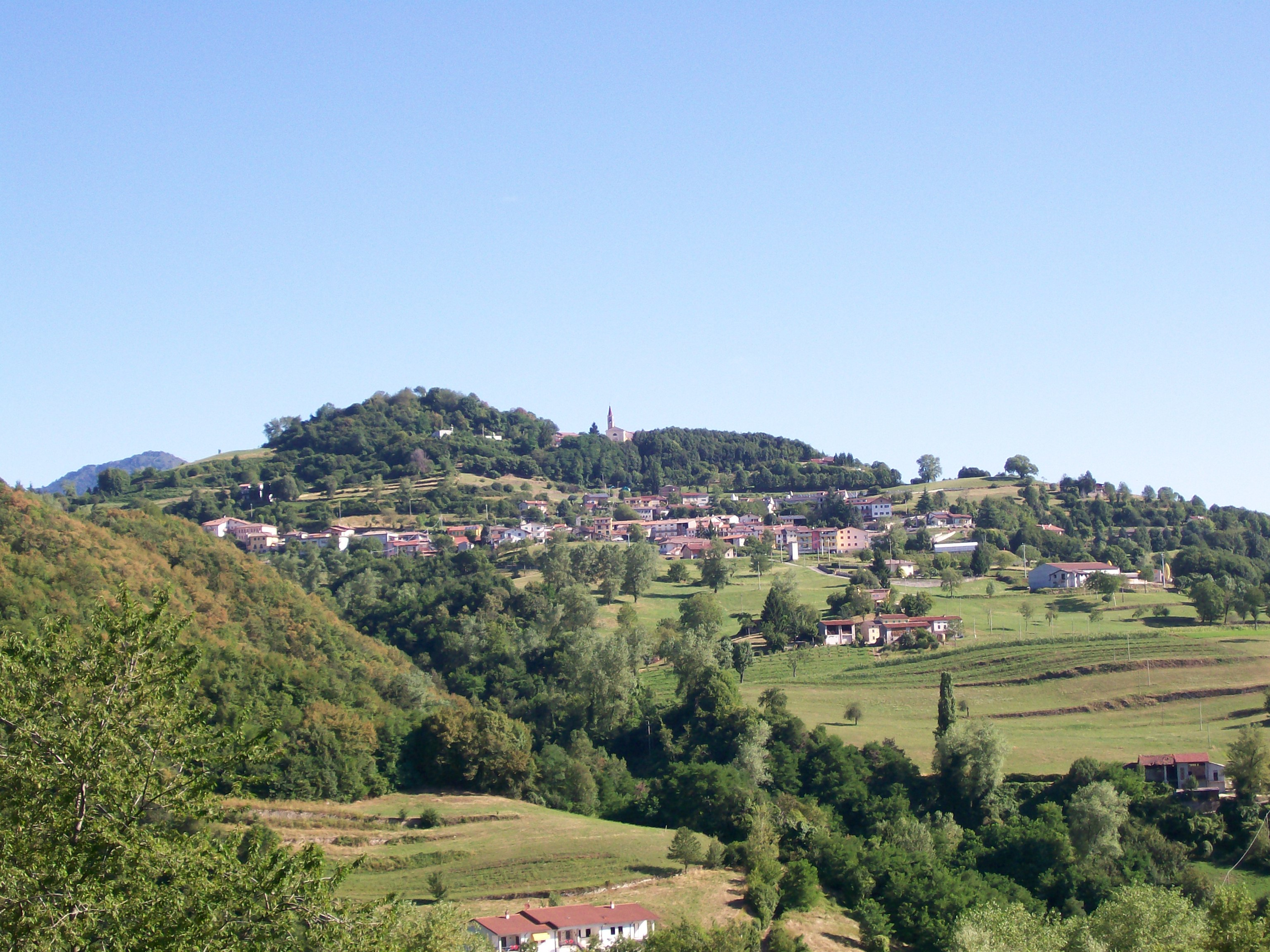
View of Bolca, a frazione of the comune of Vestenanova, Veneto

A frazione (pl.: frazioni, cognate with English fraction) is a type of subdivision of a comune ('municipality') in Italy, often a small village or hamlet outside the main town, similar to a suburb or exurb. Most frazioni were created during the Fascist era (1922–1943) as a way to consolidate territorial subdivisions in the country.

In the autonomous region of the Aosta Valley, a frazione is officially called hameau in French. In South Tyrol, a frazione is called Fraktion in German and frazion in Ladin.

== Description ==
The term is used to denote an inhabited area within a comune's territory, such as a town, village, hamlet, or locality, distinct from the capoluogo (municipal seat) due to geographical separation, historical development, or natural settlement patterns. Frazioni vary in size, ranging from small villages to large towns such as Ostia (frazione of Rome), and may have some administrative and financial autonomy.

== See also ==
- Circoscrizione
- Località
- Quartiere
- Rione
  - Rioni of Rome
- Sestiere
- Terziere
- Suburb
- Exurb
