= List of municipalities of the Metropolitan City of Venice =

The following is a list of the 44 municipalities (comuni) of the Metropolitan City of Venice in the region of Veneto in Italy.

== List ==
Municipality	Population (2026)	Area (km²)	Density
Annone Veneto	3,917	25.94	151.0
Campagna Lupia	7,116	87.59	81.2
Campolongo Maggiore	10,698	23.61	453.1
Camponogara	12,979	21.30	609.3
Caorle	10,978	153.84	71.4
Cavallino-Treporti	13,105	44.71	293.1
Cavarzere	12,730	140.44	90.6
Ceggia	6,250	22.10	282.8
Chioggia	46,951	187.91	249.9
Cinto Caomaggiore	3,172	21.32	148.8
Cona	2,767	65.11	42.5
Concordia Sagittaria	10,212	66.84	152.8
Dolo	14,993	24.28	617.5
Eraclea	11,820	95.45	123.8
Fiesso d'Artico	8,702	6.31	1,379.1
Fossalta di Piave	4,251	9.64	441.0
Fossalta di Portogruaro	5,747	31.10	184.8
Fossò	7,118	10.18	699.2
Gruaro	2,700	17.49	154.4
Jesolo	27,120	96.40	281.3
Marcon	17,664	25.55	691.4
Martellago	21,184	20.17	1,050.3
Meolo	6,155	26.61	231.3
Mira	37,465	99.14	377.9
Mirano	27,114	45.63	594.2
Musile di Piave	11,407	44.87	254.2
Noale	16,225	24.69	657.1
Noventa di Piave	7,015	18.00	389.7
Pianiga	12,305	20.07	613.1
Portogruaro	24,301	102.31	237.5
Pramaggiore	4,721	24.22	194.9
Quarto d'Altino	8,012	28.33	282.8
Salzano	12,768	17.18	743.2
San Donà di Piave	42,261	78.88	535.8
San Michele al Tagliamento	11,329	114.39	99.0
San Stino di Livenza	12,726	67.97	187.2
Santa Maria di Sala	17,488	28.05	623.5
Scorzè	18,996	33.29	570.6
Spinea	27,933	14.96	1,867.2
Stra	7,506	8.82	851.0
Teglio Veneto	2,224	11.44	194.4
Torre di Mosto	4,753	38.00	125.1
Venice	249,385	415.90	599.6
Vigonovo	9,814	12.87	762.5

== See also ==
- List of municipalities of Veneto
- List of municipalities of Italy
