= Campolongo Maggiore =

- Comune
- Comune di Campolongo Maggiore
- Coat of arms

- Location within Italy Location within Veneto
- Coordinates: 45°20′N 12°3′E
- Country: Italy
- Region: Veneto
- Metropolitan city: Venice (VE)
- Frazioni: Campagna Lupia, Camponogara, Fossò, Piove di Sacco (PD), Sant'Angelo di Piove di Sacco (PD), Bojon, Liettoli, Santa Maria Assunta

Government
  - Mayor: Alessandro Campalto (Futuro Comune)

Area
  - Total: 23.54 km^{2} (9.09 sq mi)

Population (30 April 2009)
  - Total: 10,156
  - Density: 431.4/km^{2} (1,117/sq mi)
- Demonym: Campolongari
- Time zone: UTC+1 (CET)
  - Summer (DST): UTC+2 (CEST)
- Postal code: 30010
- Dialing code: 049
- ISTAT code: 027003
- Patron saint: St. Felix and St. Fortunatus
- Saint day: 14 May
- Website: Official website

Campolongo Maggiore is a town in the Metropolitan City of Venice, Veneto, Italy. It is northeast of SS516.

The Cunetta Brenta separates the principal village from Bojon, the main frazione.

Campolongo Maggiore is governed by a centre-left political party.

It is notorious for being the hometown of Felice Maniero, former boss of the criminal organization Mala del Brenta.

== Sources ==
- (Google Maps)
