= Gerald Birks =

Canadian First World War fighter ace

Gerald Alfred Birks
- Born: 30 October 1894; Montreal, Quebec, Canada
- Died: 26 May 1991 (aged 96); Toronto, Ontario, Canada
- Military career
- Allegiance: Canada; United Kingdom (Note: Canadian airmen were required to complete an Attestation Paper in which they declared an oath of allegiance to King George V and agreed to serve in any arm of the service for the duration of the war between Great Britain and Germany.)
- Branch: Canadian Expeditionary Force; Royal Flying Corps
- Service years: 1915–1919
- Rank: Lieutenant
- Units: 73rd Battalion, CEF; No. 66 Squadron RFC/RAF
- Conflicts: World War I; Western Front; Battle of the Somme; Italian Front
- Awards: Military Cross & Bar

Lieutenant Gerald Alfred Birks MC & Bar (30 October 1894 – 26 May 1991) was a Canadian First World War fighter ace credited with twelve aerial victories while serving in the British Royal Flying Corps and Royal Air Force.

== Family background and education ==
He was one of seven children (four sons and three daughters) born to William Massey Birks and Miriam (née Gifford). His father was a partner in the jewelers Henry Birks & Sons with his father and brothers. The Birks were descended from a farming family from Darfield, Yorkshire, who emigrated to Canada in 1832.

Birks was educated at Montreal High School and Lower Canada College, and was studying architecture at McGill University when the war broke out.

== World War I ==
Birks enlisted in the Canadian Expeditionary Force on 31 August 1915, serving as a lieutenant in the 73rd Battalion (Royal Highlanders of Canada), and was wounded in November 1916 during the Battle of the Somme.

Birks joined RFC Canada on 8 March 1917, and trained as a pilot at Deseronto and Camp Borden. He flew solo after only 2 1/2 hours of flight training, and was commissioned as a second lieutenant in the RFC on 13 August 1917, but did not travel out to England until November. He was posted to No. 54 Training Squadron in December, was appointed a flying officer on 15 January 1918, and posted to the No. 2 School of Aerial Gunnery in February.

This extended training period meant that he had accumulated 138 flying hours in his pilot's logbook before he finally joined No. 66 Squadron RFC in Italy on 10 March 1918. He was assigned to "C" Flight, flying a Sopwith Camel single seat fighter, and became the preferred wingman of fellow Canadian ace Billy Barker. Birks' first aerial victory came on 18 March, when he destroyed a Rumpler reconnaissance aircraft over Pravisdomini, killing an Austro-Hungarian pilot named Shneeberger. Six days later, he set another reconnaissance aircraft on fire, killing the crew of Poelzi and Suski. His third victory would not come until 2 May, when he wounded Leutnant K. Kosiuski and drove him into a crash landing that destroyed his Albatros D.V. Two days later, Birks shot down and killed ace Oberleutnant Karl Patzelt, as well as F. Frisch. In addition to killing both Austro-Hungarian pilots, he destroyed both their Albatros D.Vs; they were credited as "captured" because they fell within Italian lines. The new ace shot down another D.V in flames a week later, on 11 May. He destroyed two Berg fighters in five minutes on a morning patrol on 19 May. The following day, he destroyed another. On 24 May, while flying with Barker, Birks was credited with shooting down Hungarian ace József Kiss of Flik 55J; Birks thus became a double ace. On 9 June Birks set another Albatros D.V on fire in mid-air. On the 21st, he capped his list of triumphs by destroying another D.V over Motta. Most unusually for a British pilot, he had no "soft" victories, such as "driven down out of control".

Birks left No. 66 Squadron on 1 July 1918, returning to the Home Establishment to serve as an instructor at the School of Aerial Fighting and Gunnery from September. He was awarded the Military Cross and a bar in lieu of a second award; both were gazetted on 16 September 1918. His citations read:

Military Cross
Lieutenant Gerald Alfred Birks, RAF.

"For conspicuous gallantry and devotion to duty in destroying six enemy aeroplanes, two of which fell on our side of the lines."

Bar to Military Cross
Lieutenant Gerald Alfred Birks, MC, RAF.

"For conspicuous gallantry and devotion to duty in destroying four enemy aeroplanes, two of which were destroyed in one fight."

Birks was transferred to the RAF's unemployed list on 13 March 1919.

=== List of aerial victories ===
Combat record
No.	Date/Time	Aircraft/ Serial No.	Opponent	Result	Location	Notes
1	18 March 1918 @ 0825	Sopwith Camel (B6424)	Rumpler C	Destroyed	Pravisdomini	Pilot: Shneeberger (KIA)
2	24 March 1918 @ 1145	Sopwith Camel (B2497)	C	Destroyed in flames	South-east of Conegliano	Crew: Poelzi (KIA) and Suski (KIA)
3	2 May 1918 @ 1145	Sopwith Camel (B6424)	Albatros D.V	Destroyed	Levico	Pilot: Leutnant K. Kosiuski (WIA)
4	4 May 1918 @ 0945–0950	Sopwith Camel (B6424)	Albatros D.V	Destroyed	Vidor	Pilot: F. Frisch (KIA)
5	4 May 1918 @ 0945–0950	Sopwith Camel (B6424)	Albatros D.V	Destroyed	Vidor	Pilot: Oberleutnant Karl Patzelt (KIA)
6	11 May 1918 @ 1645	Sopwith Camel (B7358)	Albatros D.V	Destroyed in flames	Torre di Mosto	
7	19 May 1918 @ 0735–0740	Sopwith Camel (D1913)	Berg D	Destroyed	Borgo	
8	19 May 1918 @ 0735–0740	Sopwith Camel (D1913)	Berg D	Destroyed	Borgo	
9	20 May 1918 @ 1200	Sopwith Camel (D1913)	Berg D	Destroyed	Valdobbiadene	
10	24 May 1918 @ 1045	Sopwith Camel (B6424)	Berg D	Destroyed	Lamon	Pilot: József Kiss (KIA)
11	9 June 1918 @ 1020	Sopwith Camel (D8101)	Albatros D.V	Destroyed in flames	Levico	
12	21 June 1918 @ 0910	Sopwith Camel (D8101)	Albatros D.V	Destroyed	Motta	

== Postwar career ==
After the war, Birks rejoined the family jewelry business, and on 21 August 1924, he married Margaret Ryrie of Toronto. Birks became a patron of the arts, and was an active painter until his death in Toronto on 26 May 1991.
