= Chions =

Chions Cjons (Friulian)
- Comune
- Comune di Chions
- Location within Italy Location within Friuli-Venezia Giulia
- Coordinates: 45°51′N 12°43′E
- Country: Italy
- Region: Friuli-Venezia Giulia
- Province: Pordenone (PN)
- Frazioni: Basedo, Taiedo, Villotta, Torrate

Area
  - Total: 33.5 km^{2} (12.9 sq mi)
- Elevation: 15 m (49 ft)

Population (Dec. 2004)
  - Total: 4,896
  - Density: 146/km^{2} (379/sq mi)
- Time zone: UTC+1 (CET)
  - Summer (DST): UTC+2 (CEST)
- Postal code: 33083
- Dialing code: 0434
- Website: Official website

Chions (Friulian: Cjons) is a comune (municipality) in the Regional decentralization entity of Pordenone, in the Italian region of Friuli-Venezia Giulia, located about 90 kilometres (56 mi) northwest of Trieste and about 14 kilometres (9 mi) southeast of Pordenone. As of 31 December 2004, it had a population of 4,896 and an area of 33.5 square kilometres (12.9 mi^{2}).

The municipality of Chions contains the frazioni (boroughs) of Basedo, Taiedo, Villotta, and Torrate.

Chions borders the following municipalities: Azzano Decimo, Cinto Caomaggiore, Fiume Veneto, Pramaggiore, Pravisdomini, San Vito al Tagliamento, Sesto al Reghena.

== Demographic evolution ==
Historical population

Year	Pop.	±%
1861	?	—
1871	2,693	—
1881	2,659	−1.3%
1901	3,159	+18.8%
1911	4,475	+41.7%

Year	Pop.	±%
1921	5,255	+17.4%
1931	5,370	+2.2%
1936	4,769	−11.2%
1951	4,705	−1.3%
1961	3,561	−24.3%

Year	Pop.	±%
1971	3,230	−9.3%
1981	3,811	+18.0%
1991	4,055	+6.4%
2001	4,523	+11.5%

Source: Data from ISTAT

== Twin towns ==
Chions is twinned with:

- Luisant, France
- Villanueva del Pardillo, Spain
