= Cordovado =

Cordovado Cordovât (Friulian)
- Comune
- Comune di Cordovado
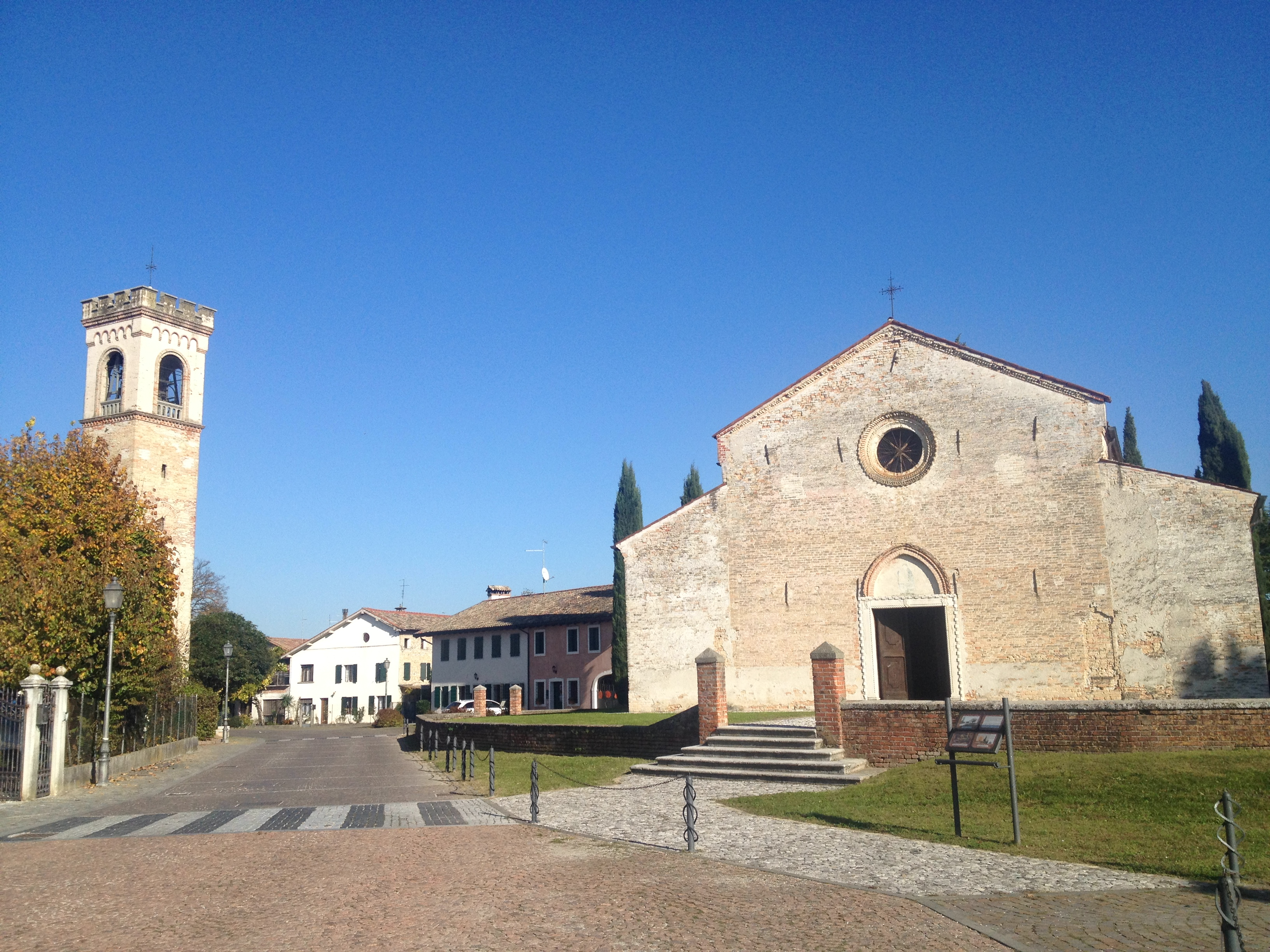
- Cathedral of Sant'Andrea

- Coat of arms

- Location within Italy Location within Friuli-Venezia Giulia
- Coordinates: 45°51′N 12°53′E
- Country: Italy
- Region: Friuli-Venezia Giulia
- Province: Pordenone (PN)
- Frazioni: Suzzolins

Government
  - Mayor: Lucia Brunettin

Area
  - Total: 12.1 km^{2} (4.7 sq mi)
- Elevation: 15 m (49 ft)

Population (April 2009)
  - Total: 2,691
  - Density: 222/km^{2} (576/sq mi)
- Time zone: UTC+1 (CET)
  - Summer (DST): UTC+2 (CEST)
- Postal code: 33073
- Dialing code: 0434
- Website: Official website

Cordovado (Friulian: Cordovât) is a comune (municipality) in the Regional decentralization entity of Pordenone in the Italian region of Friuli-Venezia Giulia, located about 80 kilometres (50 mi) northwest of Trieste and about 20 kilometres (12 mi) southeast of Pordenone.

Cordovado borders the following municipalities: Gruaro, Morsano al Tagliamento, Sesto al Reghena, Teglio Veneto. It is one of I Borghi più belli d'Italia ("The most beautiful villages of Italy").
