= Noale =

- Comune
- Comune di Noale
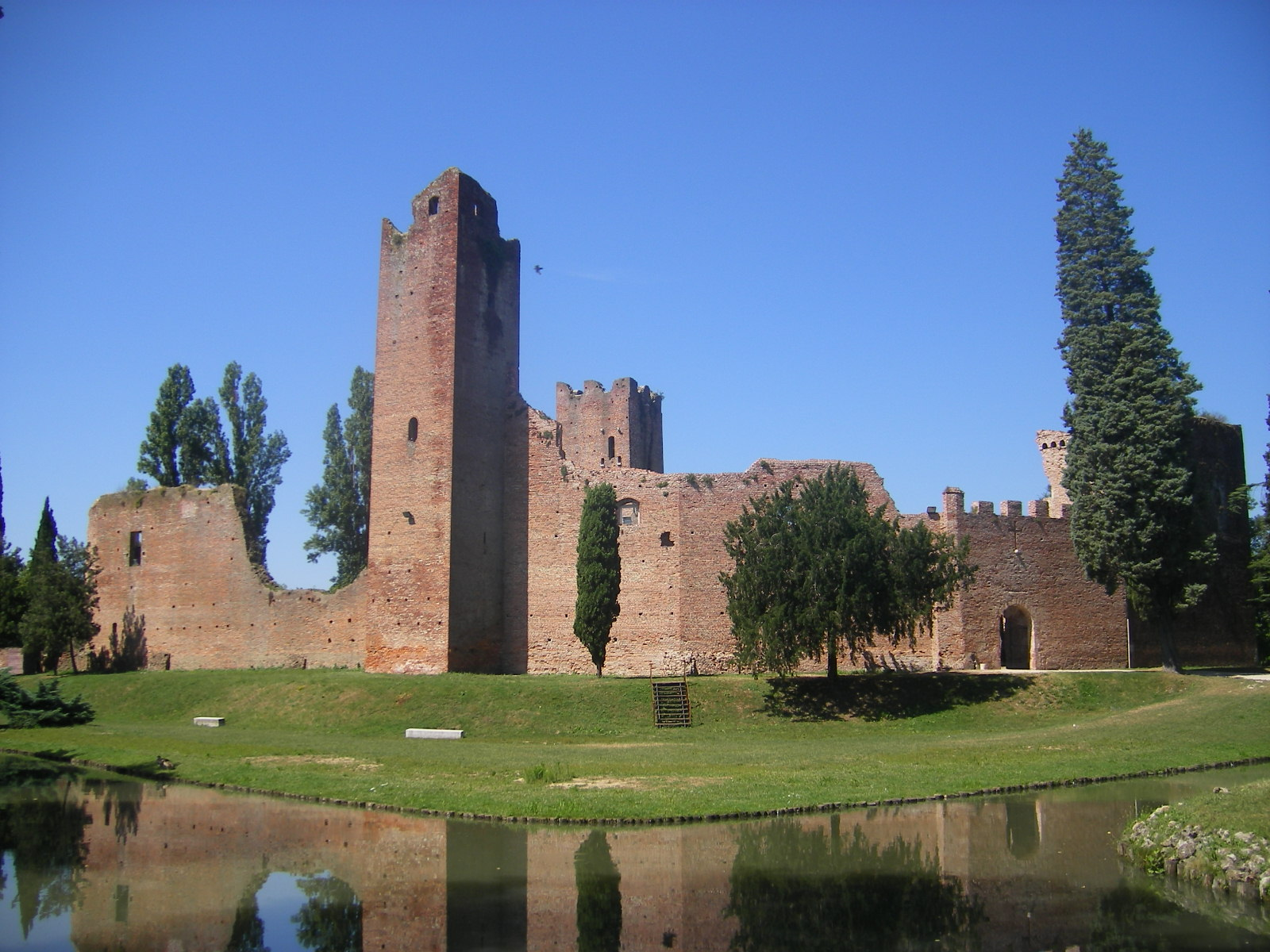

- Location within Italy Location within Veneto
- Coordinates: 45°33′N 12°4′E
- Country: Italy
- Region: Veneto
- Metropolitan city: Venice (VE)
- Frazioni: Briana, Cappelletta, Moniego

Area
  - Total: 25 km^{2} (9.7 sq mi)
- Elevation: 18 m (59 ft)

Population (31 May 2008)
  - Total: 15,619
  - Density: 620/km^{2} (1,600/sq mi)
- Demonym: Noalesi
- Time zone: UTC+1 (CET)
  - Summer (DST): UTC+2 (CEST)
- Postal code: 30033
- Dialing code: 041
- ISTAT code: 027026
- Patron saint: Madonna del Rosario
- Saint day: 7 October
- Website: Official website

Noale is a town in the Metropolitan City of Venice, Veneto, Italy.

It is part of the Miranese district, together with the neighboring municipalities of Mirano, Santa Maria di Sala, Salzano, Scorzè, Spinea and Martellago.

The town is home to the thrash metal band Catarrhal Noise and the motorcycle manufacturer Aprilia.

== Palio ==
The Palio di Noale is the annual historical re-enactment of a medieval contest which was held under the seigniory of the Tempesta family. Historical documents show that the Palio was first celebrated in 1339, in occasion of Pentecost. It was originally intended to commemorate Noale's annexation to Treviso's possessions.

The modern Palio takes place in the month of June, over the Pentecost period, and sees the participation of different teams, coming from the surrounding areas as well. More specifically, the main contest involves the following seven districts: Bastia, Cerva, Drago, Gato, S. Giorgio, S.Giovanni and S.Urbano. In accordance with the historical tradition, the winner of the contest is awarded with a drape designed by local artists.

== Sister cities ==
Dilijan, Armenia (since July 2011)
