= Luigi Rosa =

Italian painter (1850–1919)

- Born: August 6, 1850; Venice
- Died: 1919 (aged 68–69); Rome

Luigi Rosa (Venice, August 6, 1850 – Rome, 1919) was an Italian painter, mainly of vedute of his native lagoon.

He studied at the Royal Academy of Fine Arts of Venice. In 1880 at Turin, he exhibited Interior of the Church of the Frari in Venice; in 1881 at Milan and Venice: Sul Livenza; Maremma; Un rio; Un campo a Venezia e Sul Gorgazzo. In 1883 exhibited at Rome and Milan: Araldi; In Laguna; In the Lagoon after the rain; A Chioggia; and In Marzo. In 1884 at Turin, he displayed A Summer Morning in the Lagoon; Venice, Pescheria; Venice, Sul prato; and In principio d'autunno. In 1887 to Venice, he sent: San Marco; Nubi d' estate; and finally to Bologna in 1888: Venice, Case di Pescatori; Crepuscolo; and Alla Giudecca. His daughter Maria married Gian Francesco Malipiero, an Italian pianist and orchestra director.
