= Umberto Volante =

Italian sculptor

- Born: 5 May 1925; Cona, Italy
- Died: 15 April 2016 (aged 90); Merano, Italy
- Education: Accademia di Belle Arti di Venezia
- Occupations: sculptor, teacher and traveller
- Spouse: Nora Rollandini

Umberto Volante (5 May 1925 – 15 April 2016) was an Italian sculptor, educator and traveler.

== Biography ==
Born in Cona, in the province of Venice, Umberto Volante moved with his family at the age of three to Merano, in the province of Bolzano. After elementary school, he attended the State Institute of Art in Ortisei, becoming a master of art under the guidance of Ludwig Moroder (Bera Ludwig); in this period he was in close contact, among others, with Augusto Murer, Bruno Visentin and Claudio Trevi.

He graduated from the Art Institute of Carmini in Venice, then directed by Prof. Giorgio Wenter Marini.

He then attended the Magistery of Art and the Accademia di Belle Arti di Venezia, under the guidance of Alberto Viani. In 1948 he began the activity of sculptor in his studio in Merano, alternating it with the teaching of wood carving at the Art Institute of Carmini, which continued until 1965 (except for an interval between 1950 and 1956).

In this period, he also deepened the use of other plastic techniques, such as majolica, mosaic, bronze, embossed metal, as well as the pictorial techniques of fresco and graffiti and the graphic techniques of xylography. He came into contact with several artists of the Venetian circle of that time, such as Federico De Rocco, Mario Dinon, Bruno Saetti, Giulio Alchini, Amedeo Renzini, Sergio Schirato, Riccardo Schweizer, Yvan Beltrame, Eronda (Mario De Donà), Gazar Ghazikian.

In the interval between 1950 and 1956, he lived again in Merano, where he frequented the artistic environment of the town and where he befriended other artists, such as Ugo Claus, Oswald Kofler, Oskar Müller, Peter Fellin, Anton Frühauf, Emilio Dall'Oglio.

After several trips to different European cities, he settled permanently in Merano, continuing his research and artistic production alongside the teaching of art education at the Middle School G. Segantini.

He was commissioned to create frescoes and decorative graffiti for numerous buildings in Merano, Algund, Roveré della Luna, Malosco, Antholz, and Castello Tesino. He also designed and decorated some tombs in the cemetery of Merano.

From 1963 to 1973 he organized ceramic courses, attended by many citizens, to whom he taught the technique of modelling and decoration of ceramics, majolica and terracotta; at the end of the courses, the works of the students were exhibited at the Kursaal of Merano, hosted by the Tourist Office.

After his retirement, he continued to broaden and deepen his use of various expressive means (enamel on bronze, detachment of wall paintings, lacquer on wood), continuing his production until the last months before his death.

=== Travels ===
Great importance assumed, in the artistic production of Umberto Volante, the various trips made in Europe:

- travel to Paris, with his wife Nora and friend Giulio Alchini, in 1957;
- travel to Madrid, with his family, through France and Spain, in 1959;
- travel through Italy, with his family, in 1963;
- travels to Athens, with his family, through Yugoslavia, Hungary, Romania, Bulgaria and Turkey, in 1968, 1969, 1971 and 1974;
- travel to Hämeenlinna, with his wife Nora, his brother Tiziano and his sister-in-law Sirpa.

== Artistic activity ==
=== Group exhibitions ===
- Exhibition of Modern Art, Kursaal, Merano, October 20 - November 5, 1950
- XXVII International Exhibition of Art, Venice, June 19 to October 27, 1954
- Exhibition of Venetian Artistic Craftsmanship, Geneva, 1954-1955
- International Craftsmanship Exhibition, Munich, 1956
- XXVIII International Exhibition of Art, Venice, June 16 to October 21, 1956
- Santini, Volante and Tosello, City of Venice - Opera Bevilacqua La Masa (now Fondazione Bevilacqua La Masa), Venice, June 1–12, 1958
- Venetian Sculptors, City of Venice - Opera Bevilacqua La Masa, Venice, October 5–15, 1961
- Artistic-well-being review in honour of Pope John XXIII, Merano, April 20 - May 26, 1991
- Warrior Breast, Pinacoteca Civica "G. Cattabriga", Bondeno, 2005
- Perspectives of Future, MeranoArte, Merano, 2012

=== Solo exhibitions ===
- Opera Bevilacqua La Masa (now Fondazione Bevilacqua La Masa), Venice, 1958
- Kuperion Gallery, Merano, 1973 and following
- Drawings and Sculptures, Exhibition Hall of the Tourist Office, Merano, January 13–21, 1973
- "Gente di Mare" Hall, Deiva Marina, June - July, 1990
- Church of the Torricella, Public Library of Castello Tesino, August 1993
- Art Gallery of the Banca Popolare dell'Alto Adige, Merano, December 1994
- Center for Culture, Mairania 857, Merano, 2006
- Exhibition Hall, Municipality of Soave, July, 2013
- Municipal Hall, Merano, May - June, 2014
- "Testa di Ponte" Museum, Algund, April, 2015

=== Main works ===
- Closet with bas-reliefs, oak wood, Peggy Guggenheim Collection, Venice, 1954
- Portals, oak wood, Church of Saint Mary of the Assumption, Merano, 1957
- Altarpiece, glazed and gilded majolica in third firing, Church of S. Maria Assunta, Merano, 1959
- Way of the Cross, glazed and gilded majolica, Church of Saint Mary of the Assumption, Merano, 1960
- Crucifix, oak wood bas-relief, Church of Christ the King, Trento, 1959
- Allegory of the school, bronze bas-relief, “G. Segantini” Middle School, Merano, 1967
- Stele in memory of Piero Richard, bronze bas-relief, Racecourse of Maia, Merano, 1972
- Sundial, majolica, Maiense Institute, Merano, 1987
- Restoration of the putti, white concrete, front of the "G. Puccini" Civic Theater of Merano, 1993
- Decorations on the facade of the Town Hall, ceramic bas-relief and graffiti, Castello Tesino, 1992

=== Other works ===
- Torso, boxwood
- Reclining figure, boxwood
- Seated figure, padouk wood
- Squatting figure, rosewood
- Seated figure, ceramic in third firing
- Centaur with bow, lost wax bronze

== Honours ==
- 5th Class / Knight: Cavaliere Ordine al Merito della Repubblica Italiana: 2 June 1994
