= Pravisdomini =

- Comune
- Comune di Pravisdomini
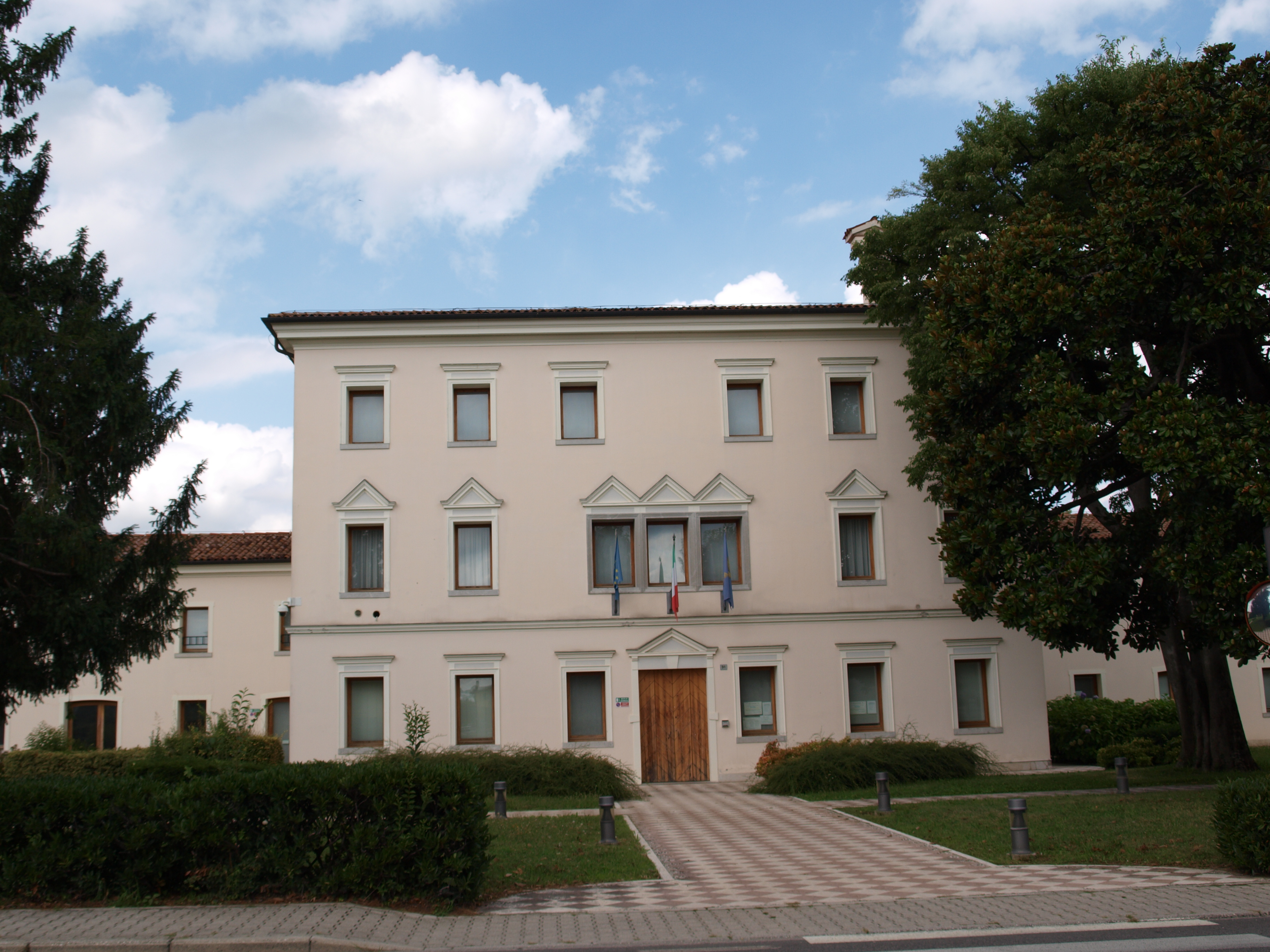
- Town hall

- Coat of arms

- Location within Italy Location within Friuli-Venezia Giulia
- Coordinates: 45°49′N 12°41′E
- Country: Italy
- Region: Friuli-Venezia Giulia
- Province: Pordenone (PN)
- Frazioni: Barco, Frattina, Panigai

Government
  - Mayor: Graziano Campaner

Area
  - Total: 16.1 km^{2} (6.2 sq mi)
- Elevation: 10 m (33 ft)

Population (April 2009)
  - Total: 3,463
  - Density: 215/km^{2} (557/sq mi)
- Demonym: Pravisdominiesi
- Time zone: UTC+1 (CET)
  - Summer (DST): UTC+2 (CEST)
- Postal code: 33076
- Dialing code: 0434

Pravisdomini is a comune (municipality) in the Regional decentralization entity of Pordenone, in the Italian region of Friuli-Venezia Giulia, located about 90 kilometres (56 mi) west of Trieste and about 15 kilometres (9 mi) south of Pordenone.

Pravisdomini borders the following municipalities: Annone Veneto, Azzano Decimo, Chions, Meduna di Livenza, Pasiano di Pordenone, Pramaggiore.
