= Camponogara =

Camponogara Canponogara
- Comune
- Comune di Camponogara
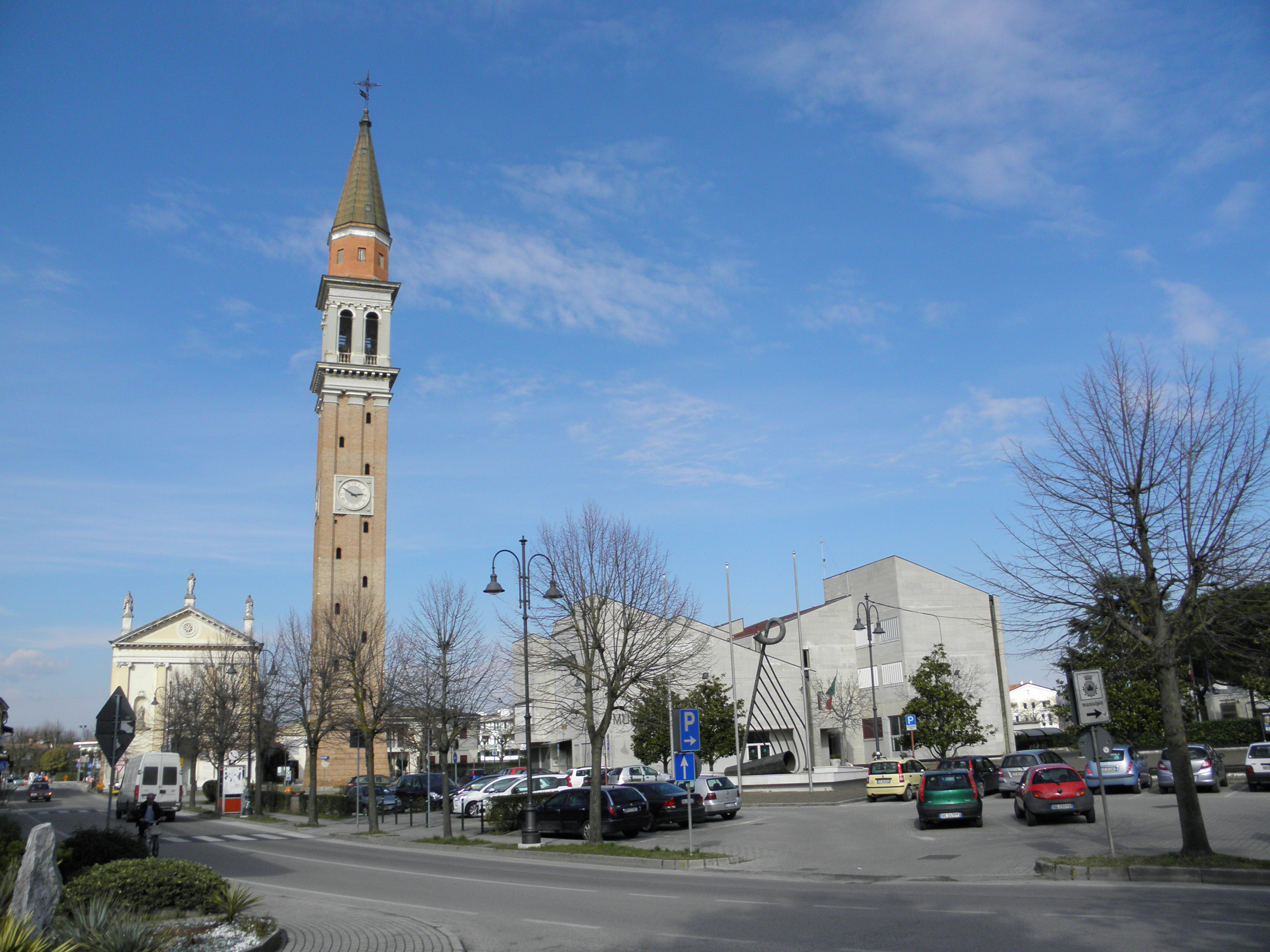
- The parish church of Santa Maria Assunta and San Prosdocimo. On the right, the town hall

- Coat of arms

- Location of Camponogara in Italy Camponogara (Veneto)
- Coordinates: 45°23′N 12°4′E
- Country: Italy
- Region: Veneto
- Metropolitan city: Venice (VE)
- Frazioni: Calcroci, Campoverardo, Premaore, Prozzolo

Government
  - Mayor: Antonio Fusato (since 26 May 2019) (civic list "Insieme con Antonio Fusato")

Area
  - Total: 21 km^{2} (8.1 sq mi)
- Elevation: 5 m (16 ft)

Population (28 February 2022)
  - Total: 12,945
  - Density: 620/km^{2} (1,600/sq mi)
- Demonym: Camponogaresi
- Time zone: UTC+1 (CET)
  - Summer (DST): UTC+2 (CEST)
- Postal code: 30010
- Dialing code: (+39) 041
- ISTAT code: 027004
- Patron saint: Saint Apollonia
- Saint day: 9 February
- Website: Official website

Camponogara (Venetian: Canponogara) is a town in the Metropolitan City of Venice, Veneto, Italy. It is west of SP13, not far from the nearby Brenta river. Economy is based on the production of wine, including Cabernet and Merlot, and manufacturing of shoes and leather products.

Camponogara is split into different frazioni: Premaore, Camponogara, Calcroci and Campoverardo.

== History ==
The name of the town derives from Latin by the words campus and nux ("field" and "walnut"), later simplified by Venetian language to Camponogara. That name stands as a witness of the ancient plantations typical of the territory.

The name of the frazione of Campoverardo derives from the Germanic name Eberhard, probably a famous man that visited that territory during the 7th century. That of Prozzolo comes from the Latin word praedium ("little agricultural fund"), while Premaore is translated in "prato maggiore" ("biggest field").

== Main sights ==
- Church of Santi Maria Assunta e Prosdocimo, in the city center.
- Church of Santi Quirico e Giulitta, in Campoverardo.
- Oratory of Beata Vergine del Rosario, in Campoverardo.
- Church of San Michele Arcangelo, in Prozzolo
- Church of San Giovanni Battista, in Premaore.

== Culture ==
The comprehensive institute "Antonio Gramsci" is situated in Camponogara. Two kindergartens, three primary schools and one lower secondary school are part of this institution. There is also a municipal kindergarten and two equal kindergartens.

In the village there is a public library, the second of the Riviera del Brenta after that of Dolo.

In 2001, the "Università Popolare di Camponogara" was founded, which has branch offices in most of the municipalities of the Riviera del Brenta. Since 2016, it has also been active in Marcon and Brugine.

Near the town centre is "Dario Fo'" Theatre, housing of concerts, movies and shows.

== People ==
- Alessandro Terrin, Italian swimmer born in Camponogara.

== Twin towns ==
- Fossano, Italy
- Vinkovci, Croatia
