= Pianiga =

- Comune
- Comune di Pianiga
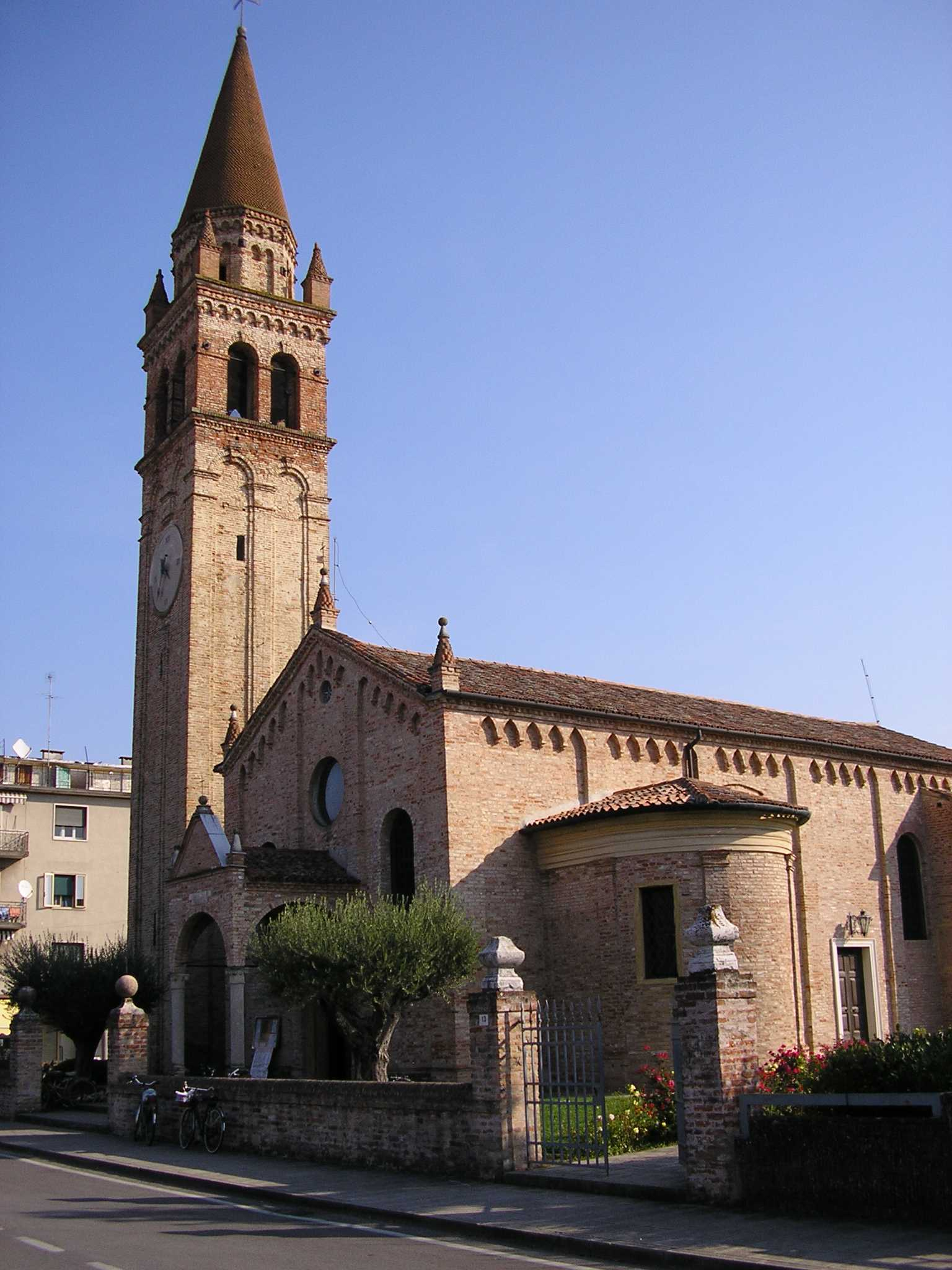
- Church of Pianiga

- Location within Italy Location within Veneto
- Coordinates: 45°27′N 12°1′E
- Country: Italy
- Region: Veneto
- Metropolitan city: Venice (VE)
- Frazioni: Cazzago, Mellaredo, Rivale

Government
  - Mayor: Massimo Calzavara

Area
  - Total: 20 km^{2} (7.7 sq mi)
- Elevation: 8 m (26 ft)

Population (31 December 2007)
  - Total: 11,314
  - Density: 570/km^{2} (1,500/sq mi)
- Demonym: Pianighesi
- Time zone: UTC+1 (CET)
  - Summer (DST): UTC+2 (CEST)
- Postal code: 30030
- Dialing code: 041
- ISTAT code: 027028
- Patron saint: San Martino di Tours
- Saint day: 11 November
- Website: Official website

Pianiga is a town in the Metropolitan City of Venice, Veneto, Italy. It is east of SR515.

Pianiga is located on the extreme southwestern edge of the Metropolitan City of Venice, in part bordering on the province of Padua and in part with the municipalities of Santa Maria di Sala, Mirano, Mira, Dolo and Fiesso d'Artico.

Up to the World War II the main occupation of the inhabitants was agriculture which was conducted in accordance with local sharecroppers or tenants who worked the land of large landowners from Venice or Padua.

From World War II onwards and then more definitely from the years of economic boom several companies were established.

Nowadays, the industries present within the municipal area of Pianiga are mostly engaged in building, metalworking and woodworking and in the production of shoes and relevant accessories.

There are also some other textile, glass processing and food processing industries.

Economic development has generated a clear environmental transformation: the reduction of large tracts of cultivated fields corresponded to an increase in built-up areas; Pianiga got the appearance of a residential centre while productive activities have been located in the closer precincts for example at Cazzago owing to the proximity of the rail station and highway exit and Mellaredo which is crossed by the state road connecting Padua to Treviso.

Rivale is the least densely populated locality of the entire municipality, though, thanks to the establishment of a number of medium and large businesses, a high level of employment is available.

Unfortunately, the initial urban development has grown spontaneously.

The territory, which until a few years ago was used exclusively for farming, still enough recently was showing several examples of different types of country cottages, from mansions to noble villas.

In the past, there were some rustic poor houses called the "casoni" (big houses) widespread in the territory which were hosting the families of labourers.

None of these structures survive in Pianiga today. Due to neglect and weathering, they gradually fell into ruin and were eventually lost.

== Sources ==
- (Google Maps)
