= Meolo =

Meolo Mègolo (Venetian)
- Comune
- Comune di Meolo
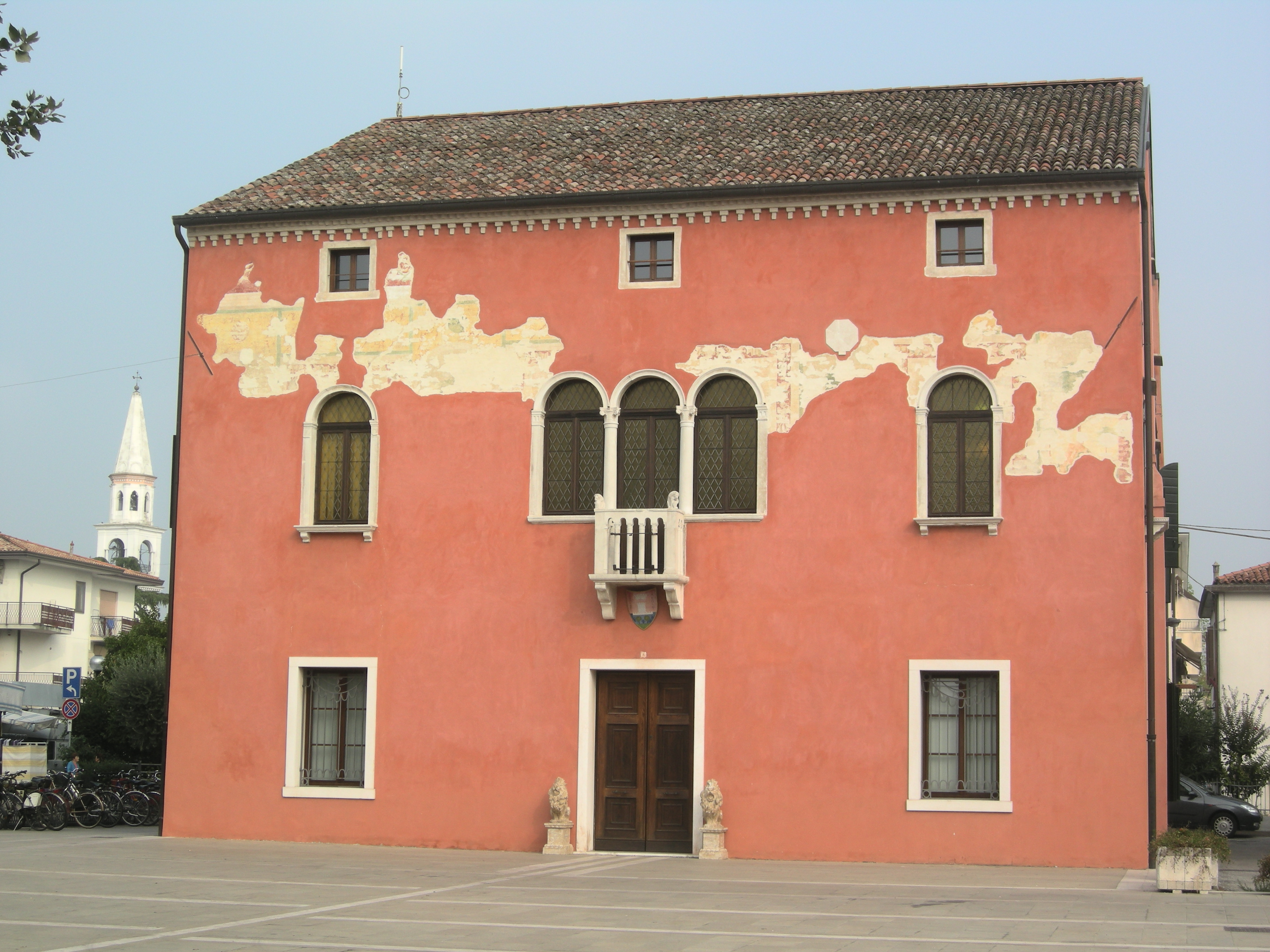
- Palazzo Cappello.

- Location within Italy Location within Veneto
- Coordinates: 45°37′13.08″N 12°27′21.24″E
- Country: Italy
- Region: Veneto
- Metropolitan city: Venice (VE)
- Frazioni: Losson della Battaglia, Marteggia

Government
  - Mayor: Daniele Pavan

Area
  - Total: 26.61 km^{2} (10.27 sq mi)
- Elevation: 2 m (6.6 ft)

Population (31 March 2017)
  - Total: 6,387
  - Density: 240.0/km^{2} (621.7/sq mi)
- Demonym: Meolesi
- Time zone: UTC+1 (CET)
  - Summer (DST): UTC+2 (CEST)
- Postal code: 30020
- Dialing code: 0421
- Patron saint: St. John the Baptist
- Saint day: 24 June
- Website: Official website

Meolo (Italian: [ˈmɛːolo]; Venetian: Mègolo ['meɣ̞oe̯o]) is a town in the Metropolitan City of Venice, Veneto, northern Italy. It lies just south of the SR89 regional road.
