= Annone Veneto =

- Comune
- Comune di Annone Veneto
- Coat of arms

- Location within Italy Location within Veneto
- Coordinates: 45°48′N 12°41′E
- Country: Italy
- Region: Veneto
- Metropolitan city: Venice (VE)
- Frazioni: Giai, Loncon, Spadacenta

Government
  - Mayor: Ada Toffolon

Area
  - Total: 25.94 km^{2} (10.02 sq mi)
- Elevation: 9 m (30 ft)

Population (31 March 2016)
  - Total: 3,946
  - Density: 152.1/km^{2} (394.0/sq mi)
- Demonym: Annonesi
- Time zone: UTC+1 (CET)
  - Summer (DST): UTC+2 (CEST)
- Postal code: 30020
- Dialing code: 0422
- Patron saint: Saint Vitalis
- Saint day: 28 April
- Website: Official website

Annone Veneto is a town in the Metropolitan City of Venice, Veneto, northern Italy, located near the Livenza river. The SP61 provincial road passes through the town.
