= Noventa di Piave =

- Comune
- Comune di Noventa di Piave
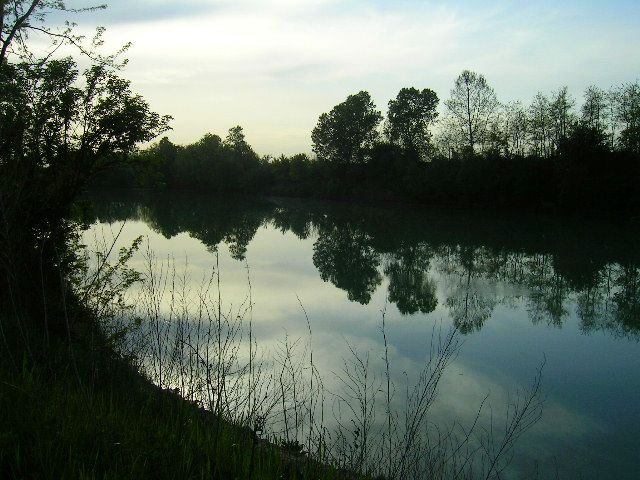
- The Piave River at Ca' Memo, in the municipality of Noventa di Piave.

- Coat of arms

- Location within Italy Location within Veneto
- Coordinates: 45°40′N 12°32′E
- Country: Italy
- Region: Veneto
- Metropolitan city: Venice (VE)
- Frazioni: Ca' Memo, Romanziol, Santa Teresina

Government
  - Mayor: Claudio Marian

Area
  - Total: 18 km^{2} (6.9 sq mi)
- Elevation: 3 m (9.8 ft)

Population (30 November 2017)
  - Total: 6,973
  - Density: 390/km^{2} (1,000/sq mi)
- Demonym: Noventani
- Time zone: UTC+1 (CET)
  - Summer (DST): UTC+2 (CEST)
- Postal code: 30020
- Dialing code: 0421
- Patron saint: Saint Maurus
- Saint day: 22 November
- Website: Official website

Noventa di Piave is a town in the Metropolitan City of Venice, Veneto, northern Italy. It is east of SP83 provincial road, and there is an exit nearby on the A4 motorway.

== Main sights ==
- Saint Maurus the Martyr Church (Italian: Chiesa di San Mauro Martire)
- Villa Da Mula Guardnieri
- Villa Bortoluzzi Del Pra
- Archaeological area of San Mauro
- Noventa Di Piave Designer Outlet
