= Metropolitan City of Venice =

Group of municipalities in Veneto, Italy

Coordinates: 45.4397°N 12.3319°E

Metropolitan City of Venice Città metropolitana di Venezia (Italian) Sità metropułitana de Venèsia (Venetian)
- Metropolitan city
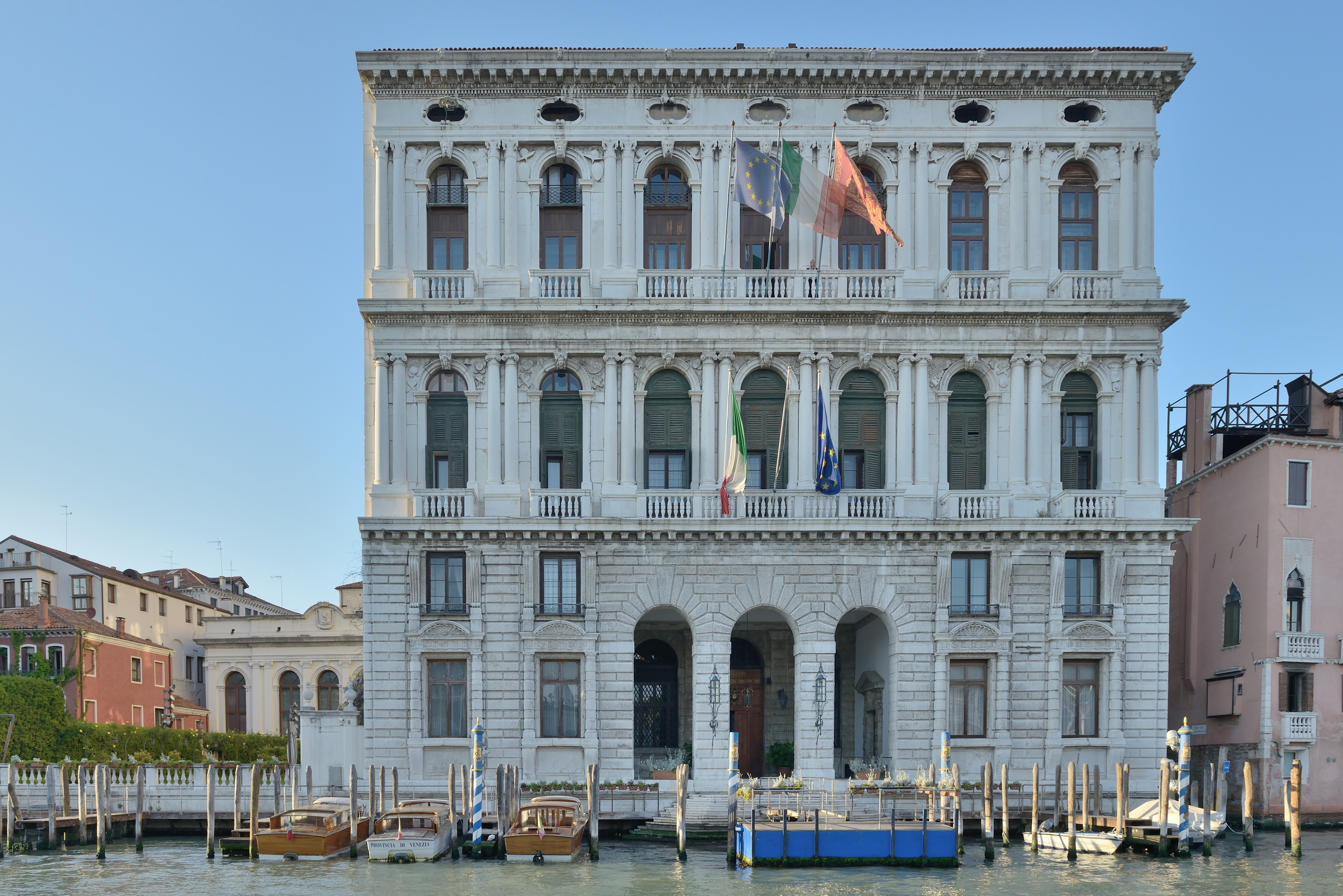
- Palazzo Corner della Ca' Grande, the seat of the metropolitan city

- Flag Coat of arms

- Location of the Metropolitan City of Venice in Italy
- Country: Italy
- Region: Veneto
- Established: 1 January 2015
- Capital(s): Venice
- Municipalities: 44

Government
  - Metropolitan mayor: Simone Venturini

Area
  - Total: 2,472.91 km^{2} (954.80 sq mi)

Population (2026)
  - Total: 834,077
  - Density: 337.286/km^{2} (873.566/sq mi)

GDP
  - Metro: €25.887 billion (2015)
  - Per capita: €30,208 (2015)
- Time zone: UTC+1 (CET)
  - Summer (DST): UTC+2 (CEST)
- Postal code: 30121-30176 (Venice); 30010-30039 (other municipalities)
- Telephone prefix: 041, 049, 0421, 0422, 0426, 0431
- ISO 3166 code: IT-VE
- Vehicle registration: VE
- ISTAT code: 227
- Website: Metropolitan City of Venice

The Metropolitan City of Venice (Italian: città metropolitana di Venezia, Venetian: Sità metropułitana de Venèsia) is a metropolitan city in the region of Veneto in northern Italy, one of the ten metropolitan cities in Italy. Its capital is the city of Venice. It replaced the province of Venice in 2015 and includes the city of Venice and 44 municipalities (comuni). It was first created by the reform of local authorities (Law 142/1990) and then established by Law 56/2014. It has a population of 834,077 in an area of 2,472.91 square kilometres (954.80 sq mi).

The Metropolitan City of Venice is headed by the Metropolitan Mayor (sindaco metropolitano) and the Metropolitan Council (consiglio metropolitano). Since 15 June 2015, as the new mayor of the capital city, Luigi Brugnaro is the first mayor of the metropolitan city.

== History ==
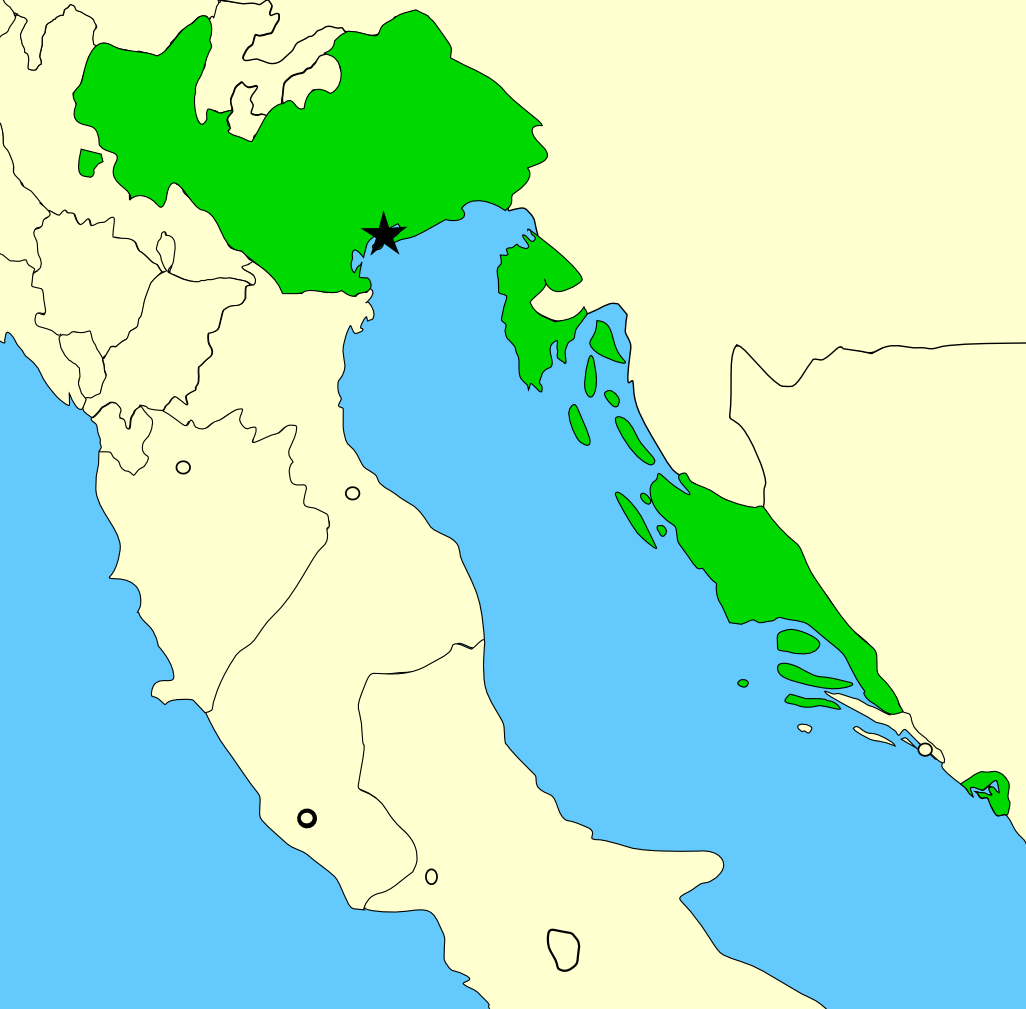
The Republic of Venice in 1797

The area was settled by the 11th century BC. According to legend, Antenor fled from Troy, leading the people of Eneti from Paphlagonia to inhabit the shores of the Adriatic. In 102 BC, The Romans defeated the Cimbri and the Germanic tribes in the area, thus increasing their influence in the region to form the Regio X Venetia et Histria. The exact date when Venice was established is unknown. Still, about 570 refugees from the hinterland, especially from Aquileia, fled to the islands of the Venetian Lagoon to escape the frequent barbaric invasions. At that time, the territory of the province was part of the Byzantine Empire, belonging to the Exarchate of Ravenna. Over the centuries, Venice became more independent and in 697 it had its first Doge. With the destruction of Eracliana in 805, the capital was moved to Rialto (Venice).

In the Middle Ages, Venice became an important maritime republic, completely independent from Byzantium, and began its expansion into the hinterland. In 1260, the Ezzelini family was defeated. Threatened by the expansionist ambitions of the Visconti of Milan, in 1365, Venice began to invade neighbouring territories. By 1410, the Regio X Venetia et Histria had annexed Padua and Verona. By the 16th century, the Republic included territories from the Julian Alps to Crema, Istria, Dalmatia, Cyprus and part of the Peloponnese. In 1797, Napoleon invaded the Republic and, following the Treaty of Campo Formio, it was ceded to Austria. After the final defeat of Napoleon, the Austrian Empire founded a province of Venice on the Adriatic Sea. In 2015, this was converted into the current metropolitan city.

== Geography ==
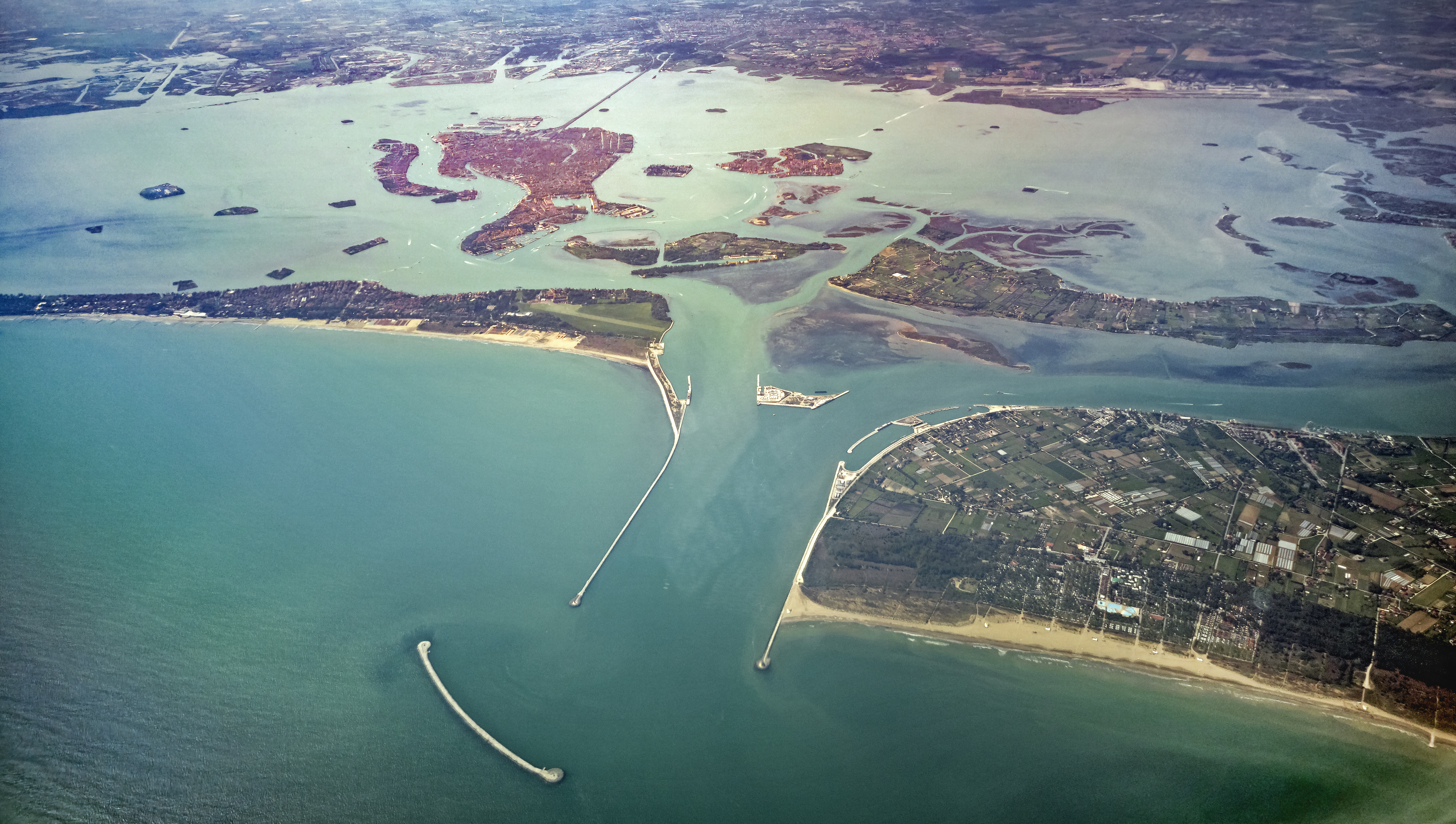
The Venetian Lagoon

Facing east on the northern Adriatic Sea, the metropolitan city is bordered to the northeast by the province of Udine and province of Pordenone, south by the province of Rovigo, and to the west by the province of Padua and province of Treviso. The municipalities of Chioggia, Cavarzere and Cona constitute an exclave, separated from the rest of the metropolitan city by the Paduan municipalities of Codevigo and Correzzola, bordering the provinces of Padua and Rovigo.

The Brenta and Livenza rivers flow through the metropolitan city. The Piave flows into the Adriatic Sea after passing the town of Eraclea. The 174 kilometres (108 mi) long Brenta runs from Trentino to the Adriatic just south of the Venetian Lagoon. It was first channeled in the 16th century when a long canal was built from the village of Stra to the Adriatic, bypassing Venetian Lagoon. A branch of the Brenta, the Naviglio Brenta, was left to directly connect Venice and Padua. The river runs through Stra, Fiesso d'Artico, Dolo, Mira, Oriago and Malcontenta to Fusina in the northeast.

In the area known as the Mandamento of Portogruaro that borders the Friuli Venezia Giulia region, it is estimated that 29% of the population speaks fluent Friulian. The language has been officially recognized and protected as a minority language since 2006.

== Government ==
=== List of metropolitan mayors ===
	Metropolitan Mayor	Term start	Term end	Party
1	Luigi Brugnaro	31 August 2015	29 May 2026	Independent (centre-right)
2	Simone Venturini	29 May 2026	Incumbent	Independent (centre-right)

=== Municipalities ===
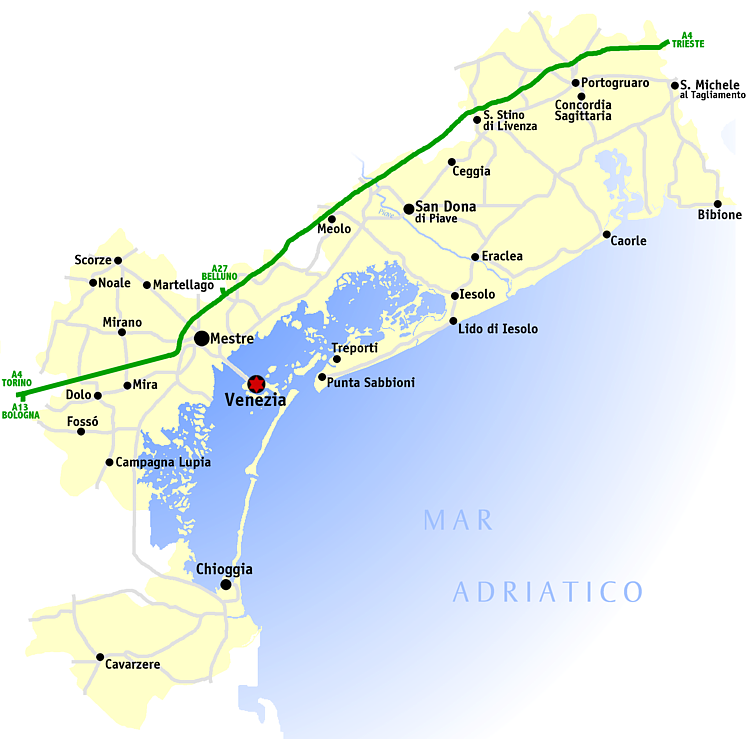
Cities, towns and roads of the metropolitan city

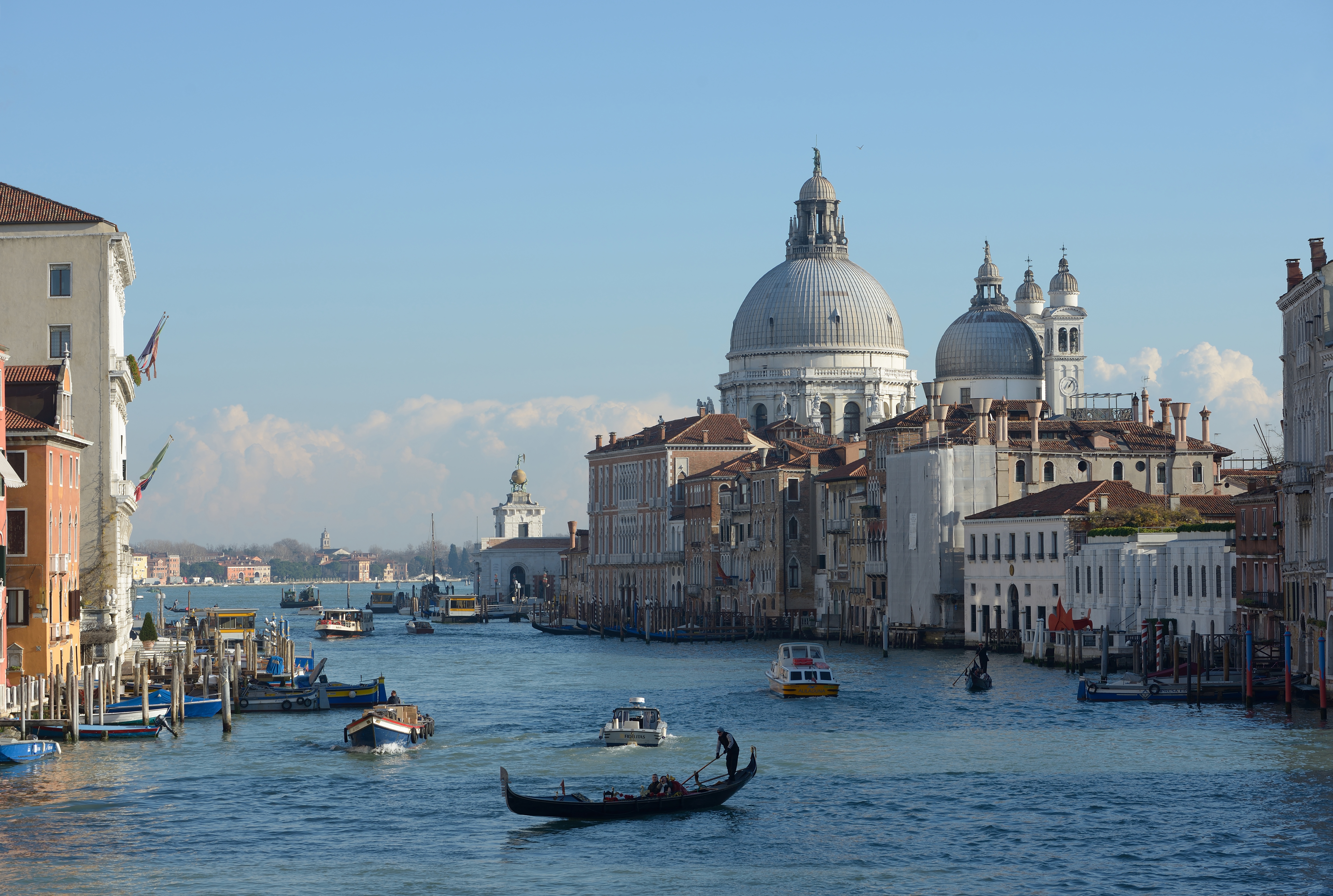
The city of Venice, ranked many times as the most beautiful city in the world

The province has 44 municipalities:

- Annone Veneto
- Campagna Lupia
- Campolongo Maggiore
- Camponogara
- Caorle
- Cavallino-Treporti
- Cavarzere
- Ceggia
- Chioggia
- Cinto Caomaggiore
- Cona
- Concordia Sagittaria
- Dolo
- Eraclea
- Fiesso d'Artico
- Fossalta di Piave
- Fossalta di Portogruaro
- Fossò
- Gruaro
- Jesolo
- Marcon
- Martellago
- Meolo
- Mira
- Mirano
- Musile di Piave
- Noale
- Noventa di Piave
- Pianiga
- Portogruaro
- Pramaggiore
- Quarto d'Altino
- Salzano
- San Donà di Piave
- San Michele al Tagliamento
- San Stino di Livenza
- Santa Maria di Sala
- Scorzè
- Spinea
- Stra
- Teglio Veneto
- Torre di Mosto
- Venice
- Vigonovo

== Demographics ==
Historical population
Year	Pop.	±%
1871	340,913	—
1881	356,283	+4.5%
1901	399,833	+12.2%
1911	467,168	+16.8%
1921	516,029	+10.5%
1931	591,656	+14.7%
1936	629,137	+6.3%
1951	740,450	+17.7%
1961	749,173	+1.2%
1971	807,251	+7.8%
1981	838,794	+3.9%
1991	820,052	−2.2%
2001	809,586	−1.3%
2011	846,962	+4.6%
2021	836,916	−1.2%
Source: ISTAT

As of 2026, the population is 834,077, of which 49.0% are male, and 51.0% are female. Minors make up 13.6% of the population, and seniors make up 26.9%.

=== Immigration ===
As of 2025, immigrants make up 13.5% of the population. The 5 largest foreign countries of birth are Moldova, Romania, Bangladesh, Albania, and Ukraine.

== Economy ==
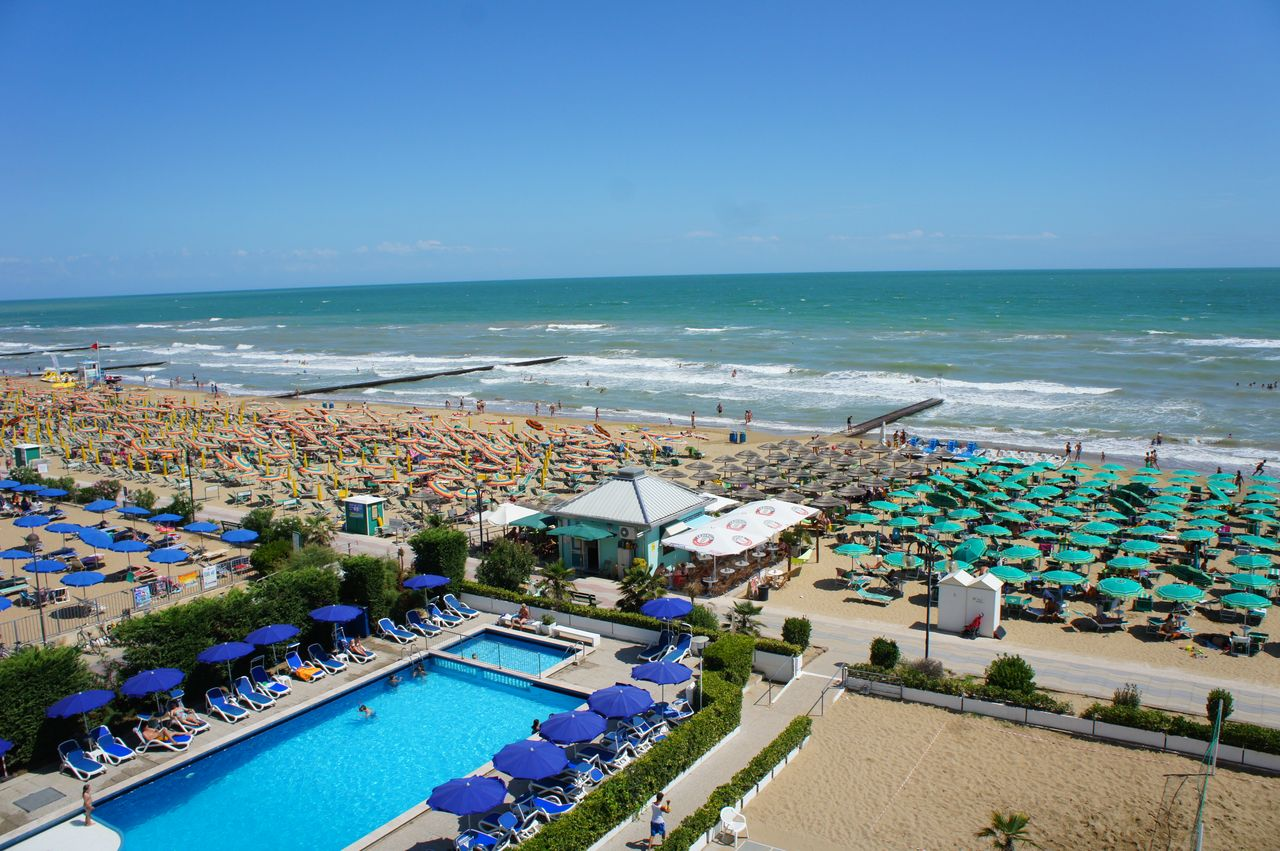
The beach of Jesolo

Tourism was an important contributor to the provincial economy with over 26,000 establishments (including 1,277 hotels) offering overnight accommodation and accounting for a total of 34 million tourist nights spent in 2012 (down slightly from 2011 but substantially higher than some 29 million nights in 2002).

The gross domestic product of the province was 25 million euro in 2010, down slightly from 25.973 million euro in 2007. In 2012, the service sector represented 73% of the economy, while industry covered 19%, construction 7% and agriculture just 1%. Footwear represented 9.6% of provincial exports, petroleum products 7.2% and machinery 6.7%.

== Metropolitan area ==
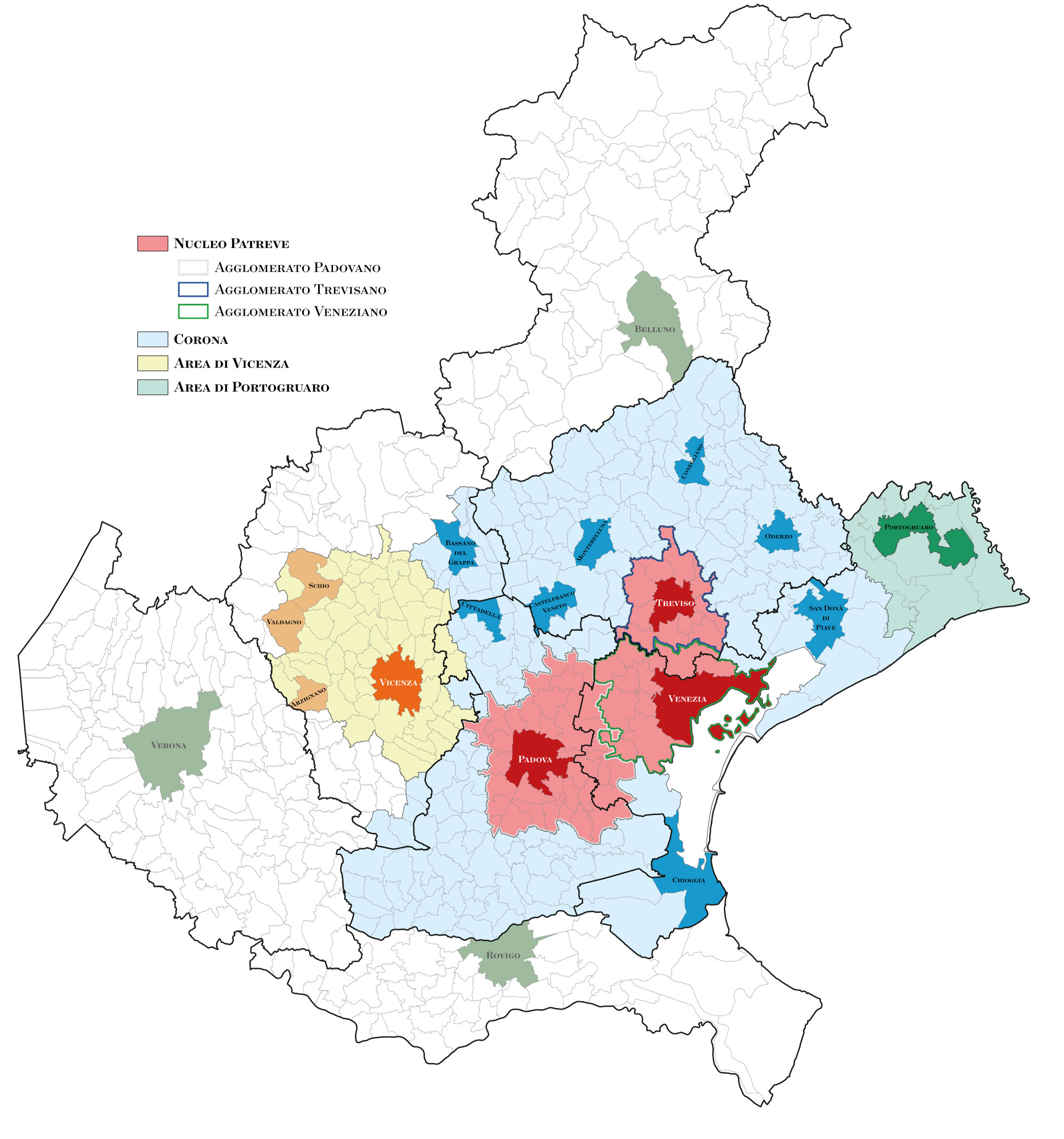
Padua–Treviso–Venice metropolitan area

The spread of the larger Venice metropolitan area has dramatically accelerated over recent decades. The Padua–Treviso–Venice metropolitan area (PATREVE), or Venice City-Region, is an urban agglomeration including the Metropolitan City of Venice as well as the cities of Padua and Treviso and their respective provinces, all in the Veneto region of northeast Italy. It is defined statistically and does not correspond to a single area of local government. Administratively it comprises 240 comuni (sing.: comune), 104 in the province of Padua, 95 in the province of Treviso and 44 in the Metropolitan City of Venice.

The metropolitan area has a total population of 2,600,000.

== Main sights ==
In addition to the city of Venice, the province offers several other attractions, including Caorle on the Adriatic Coast with its narrow streets, coloured houses, and cylindrical bell tower, and Jesolo, with its long sandy beach, tourist attractions, and nightlife.

The second largest municipality in the province, Chioggia, on the southern side of the Venetian Lagoon, includes numerous canals, bridges and mansions as well as St. Felice Castle and the Piazza di Vigo.

== Transport ==
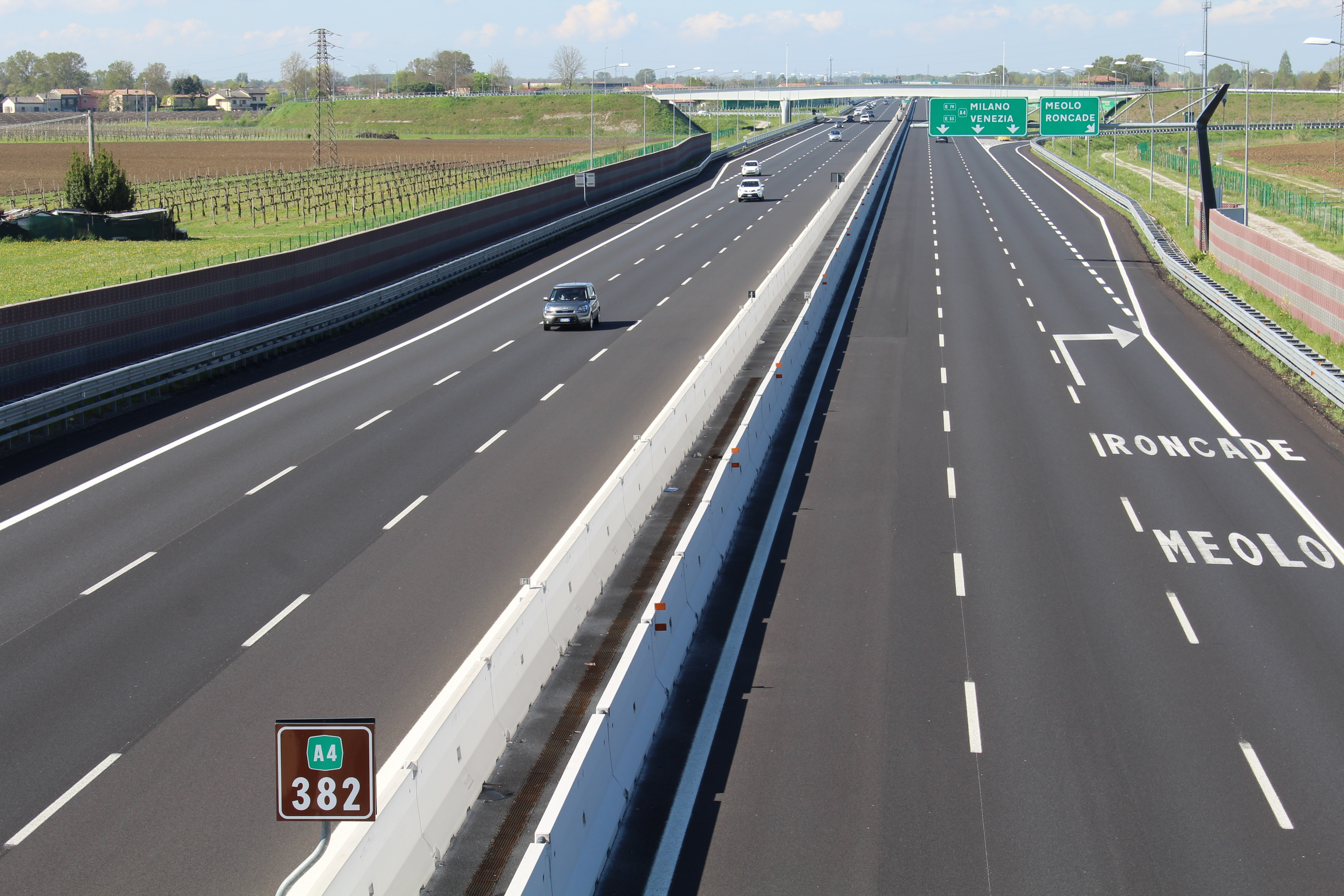
Autostrada A4 near Meolo

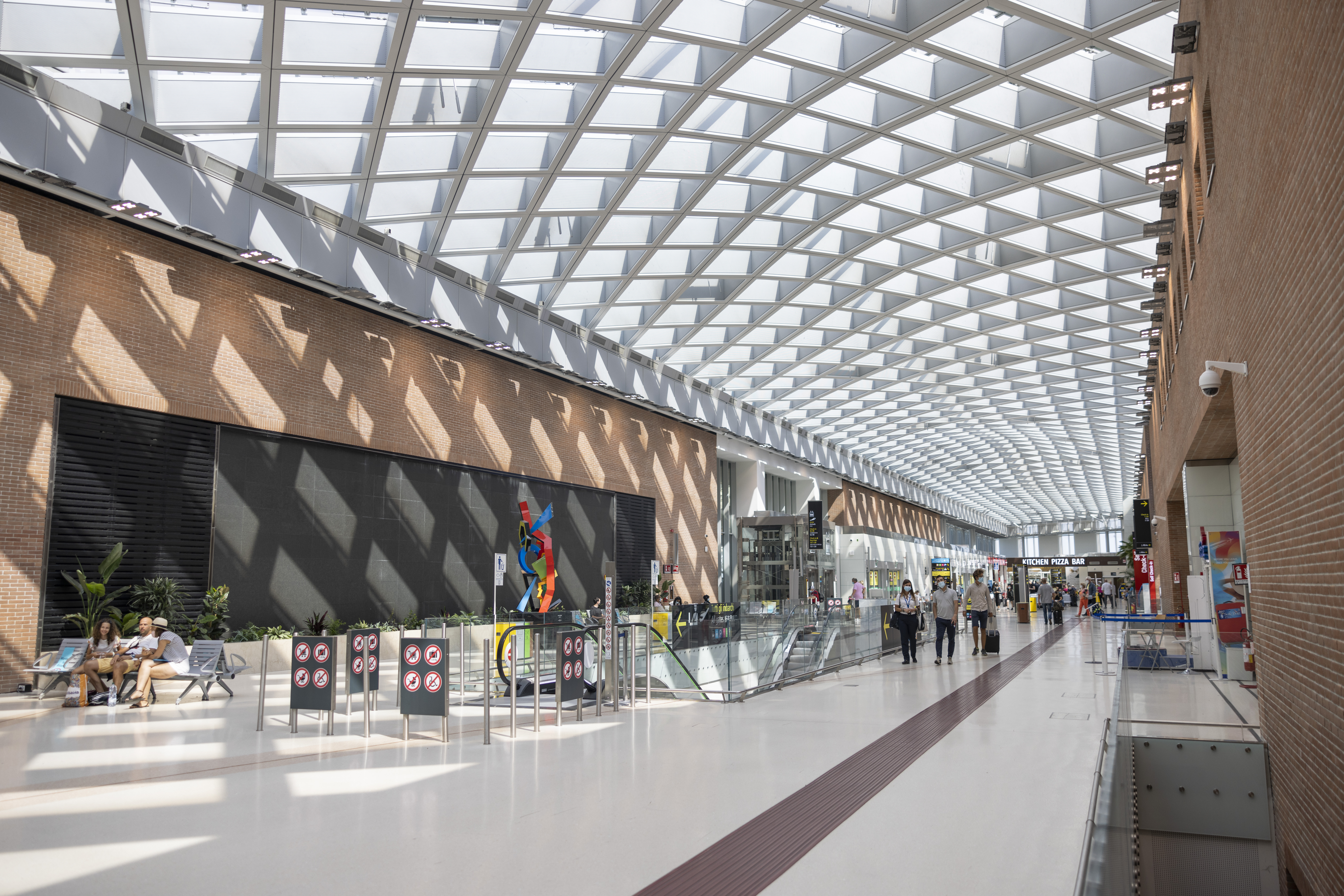
Venice Marco Polo Airport

=== Motorways ===
- Autostrada A4: Turin-Trieste
- Autostrada A27: Mestre-Belluno
- Autostrada A28: Conegliano-Portogruaro
- Autostrada A57: Dolo-Quarto d'Altino

=== Railway lines ===
- Milan–Venice railway
- Trento–Venice railway
- Venice–Trieste railway
- Venice–Udine railway
- Rovigo–Chioggia railway

=== Airports ===
- Venice Marco Polo Airport
- Venice-Lido Airport

== See also ==
- Province of Venice
