= Cona, Veneto =

Cona
- Comune
- Comune di Cona
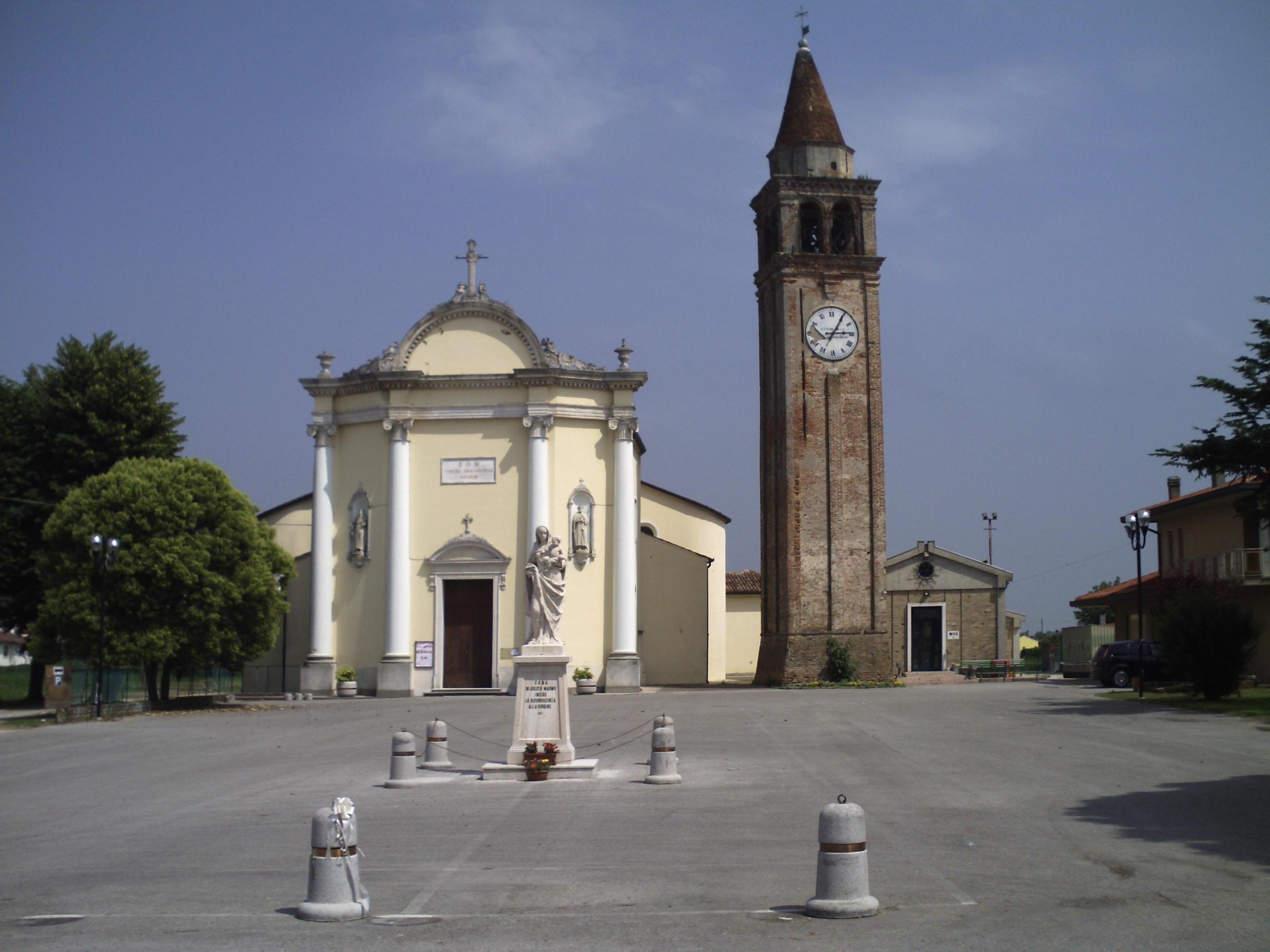

- Coat of arms

- Location within Italy Location within Veneto
- Coordinates: 45°12′N 12°02′E
- Country: Italy
- Region: Veneto
- Province: Venice (VE)
- Frazioni: Cantarana, Conetta, Monsole, Pegolotte.

Government
  - Mayor: Alessandro Aggio

Area
  - Total: 64 km^{2} (25 sq mi)
- Elevation: 3 m (9.8 ft)

Population (31 December 2014)
  - Total: 2,993
  - Density: 47/km^{2} (120/sq mi)
- Demonym: Conensi
- Time zone: UTC+1 (CET)
  - Summer (DST): UTC+2 (CEST)
- Postal code: 30010
- Dialing code: 0426
- Website: Official website

Cona is a town and comune in the Metropolitan City of Venice, Veneto, northern Italy. It lies west of SR516 (Regional Road 516).

== Sources ==
- (Google Maps)
