= Fossò =

- Comune
- Comune di Fossò
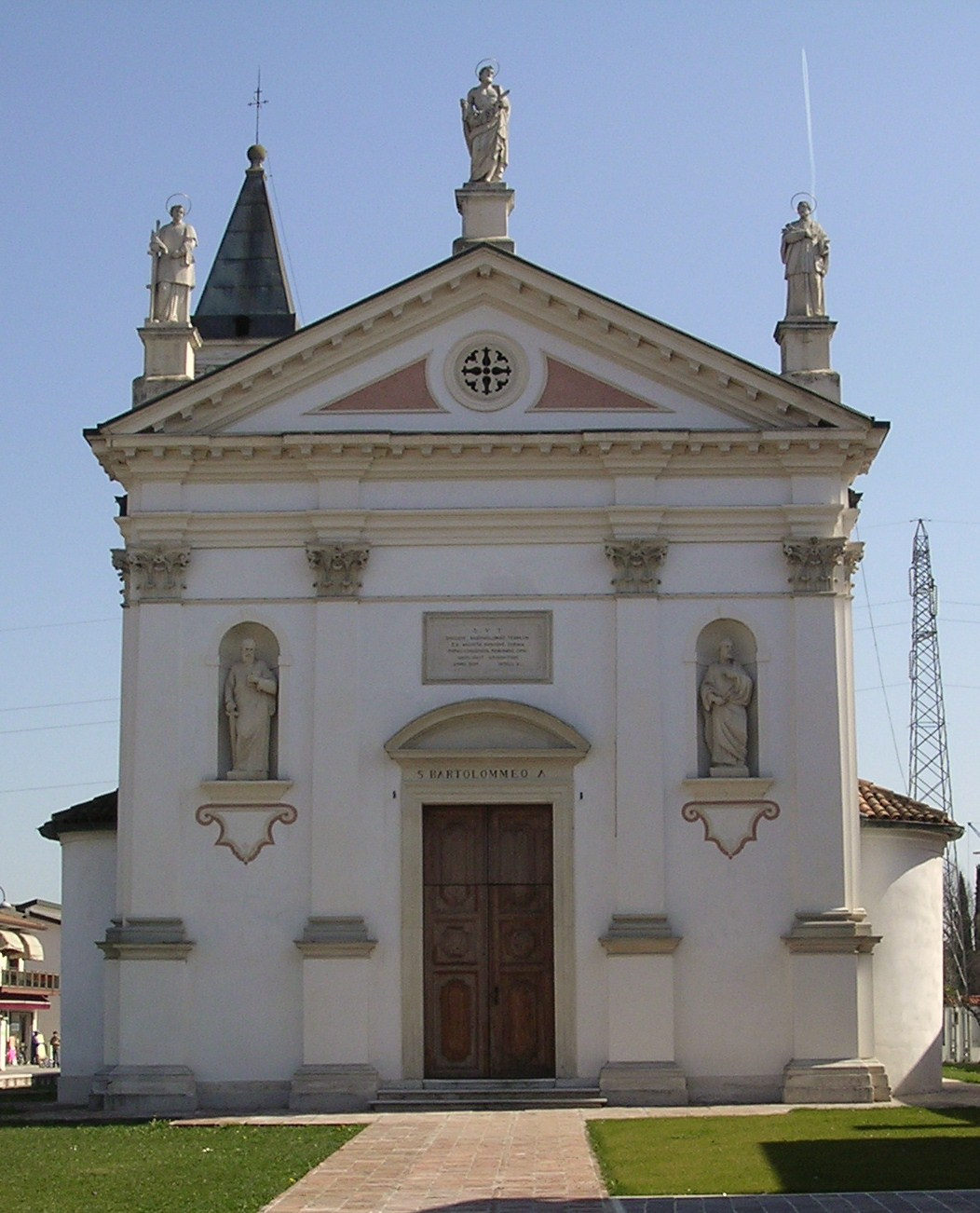
- Old church of St. Bartholomew

- Coat of arms

- Location within Italy Location within Veneto
- Coordinates: 45°23′N 12°3′E
- Country: Italy
- Region: Veneto
- Metropolitan city: Venice (VE)
- Frazioni: Sandon

Area
  - Total: 10.11 km^{2} (3.90 sq mi)
- Elevation: 9 m (30 ft)

Population (30 April 2009)
  - Total: 6,678
  - Density: 660.5/km^{2} (1,711/sq mi)
- Demonym: Fossolesi
- Time zone: UTC+1 (CET)
  - Summer (DST): UTC+2 (CEST)
- Postal code: 30030
- Dialing code: 041
- ISTAT code: 027017
- Patron saint: San Luigi
- Saint day: 24 August
- Website: Official website

Fossò is a town and comune in the Metropolitan City of Venice, Veneto, Italy. It is west of SP13.

The town of Fossò is located in a fertile plain in the territory of the Riviera del Brenta, between Padua and Venice.

The name may be derived from the Latin " Fossadum ", a ditch, with reference probably to a minor line of river Brenta.

An old sale contract shows that this town has existing at least since 1073 onwards with the consequent assumption that a church was already built here, though we must wait until 1130 to find the first sure mention of the existence of a chapel dedicated to St. Bartholomew, in a letter of the bishop of Padua.

In 1761 a new church was dedicated to St. Bartholomew to replace the previous one.

In 1797 Napoleon Bonaparte arrived in Italy and with the Treaty of Campo Formio, the glorious Republic of Venice ended forever.

Under the role of the Napoleonic Kingdom of Italy, the municipalities of Fossò and Sandon were created in 1806 and assigned first to the current Province of Padua and then to the current Province of Venice, the year later.

After World War II, Fossò had a good economic development, with the consequent urban expansion and substantial growth of the population, so that in 1957 it was necessary to build a new larger church.

Nowadays, either the new and the old church, both dedicated to St. Bartholomew, are standing one opposite to the other on the main square of Fossò.

The economical development transformed the town, once mostly agricultural, into a purely industrial and commercial place.

== Twin towns ==
Fossò is twinned with:

- Čitluk, Bosnia and Herzegovina

== Sources ==
- (Google Maps)
