= Torre di Mosto =

- Comune
- Comune di Torre di Mosto
- Location within Italy Location within Veneto
- Coordinates: 45°41′N 12°43′E
- Country: Italy
- Region: Veneto
- Metropolitan city: Venice (VE)
- Frazioni: Sant'Anna di Boccafossa, Staffolo Località: Sant'Elena, Senzielli, Tezze

Area
  - Total: 38 km^{2} (15 sq mi)
- Elevation: 2 m (6.6 ft)

Population (28 February 2007)
  - Total: 4,575
  - Density: 120/km^{2} (310/sq mi)
- Demonym: Torresani
- Time zone: UTC+1 (CET)
  - Summer (DST): UTC+2 (CEST)
- Postal code: 30020
- Dialing code: 0421
- ISTAT code: 027041
- Patron saint: San Martino di Tours
- Saint day: 11 November
- Website: Official website

Torre di Mosto is a town in the Metropolitan City of Venice, Veneto, Italy. It is south of SP18.

== Sources ==
- (Google Maps)
