= Livenza =

Coordinates: 45°35′N 12°52′E

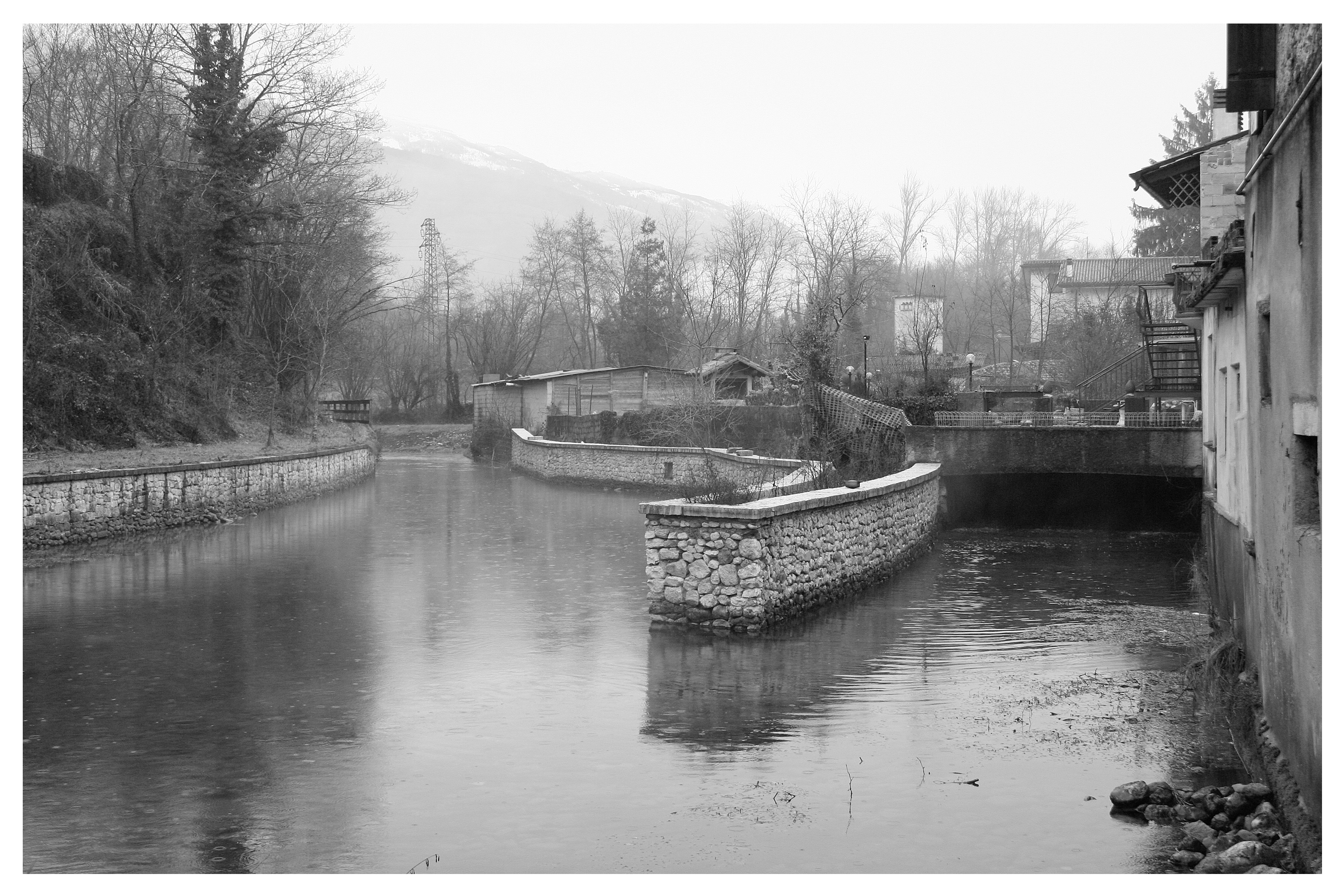
- The Livenza flowing by Polcenigo
- Native name: Livence (Friulian); Łivensa (Venetian)

Location
- Country: Italy
- Regions: Friuli-Venezia Giulia, Veneto

Physical characteristics
- Source
  - location: near Polcenigo
- Mouth
  - location: Adriatic Sea

The Livenza (Latin: Liquentia; Friulian: Livence; Venetian: Łivensa) is a river in the Italian provinces of Pordenone, Treviso and Venice. Its source is near Polcenigo and Caneva in Pordenone. It flows in a southeasterly direction past Sacile and forms the border between the provinces of Pordenone and Treviso roughly between Brugnera and Motta di Livenza. It continues to flow in a southeasterly direction, forming the border between the provinces of Treviso and Venice before flowing into the province of Venice near Santo Stino di Livenza. It flows near La Salute di Livenza and finally enters the Adriatic Sea near Caorle.
