= Spinea =

- Comune
- Comune di Spinea
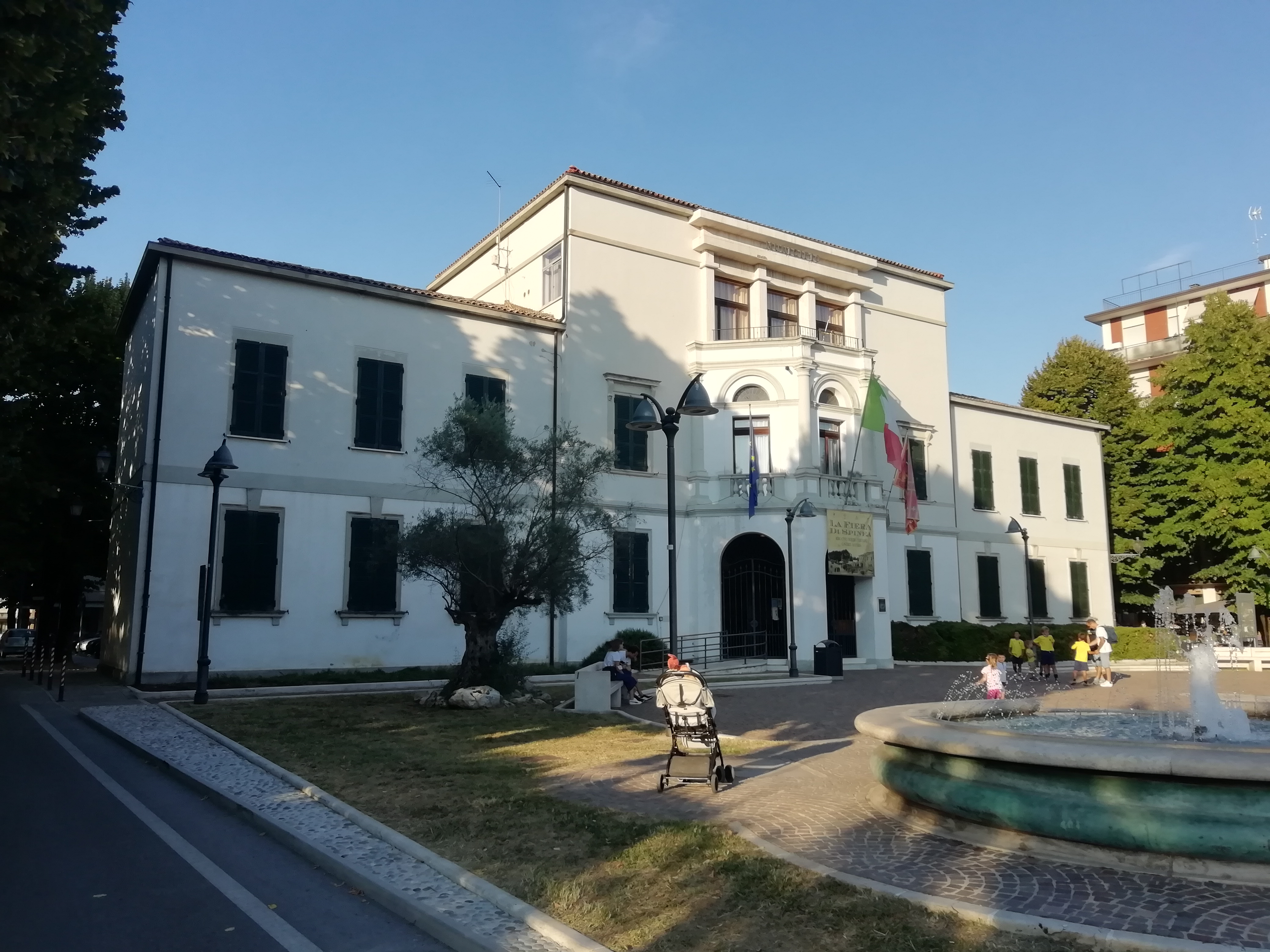
- Town hall

- Coat of arms

- Location within Italy Location within Veneto
- Coordinates: 45°30′N 12°9′E
- Country: Italy
- Region: Veneto
- Metropolitan city: Venice (VE)
- Frazioni: Costituzione, Crea, Fornase, Fornase Sud, Fossa, Graspo D'Uva, Luneo, Olmo, Spinea-Orgnano, Taglio, Villafranca, Zigaraga

Government
  - Mayor: Martina Vesnaver (Lega Nord)

Area
  - Total: 14.96 km^{2} (5.78 sq mi)
- Elevation: 6 m (20 ft)

Population (1 January 2021)
  - Total: 27,446
  - Density: 1,835/km^{2} (4,752/sq mi)
- Demonym: Spinetense(i)
- Time zone: UTC+1 (CET)
  - Summer (DST): UTC+2 (CEST)
- Postal code: 30038
- Dialing code: 041
- ISTAT code: 027038
- Patron saint: Frances of Rome
- Saint day: 9 March
- Website: Official website

Spinea is a town in the Metropolitan City of Venice, Veneto, Italy. It is within Mestre's commuter belt, and is crossed by the SP32 provincial road.

== Twin towns ==
Spinea is twinned with:

- Veroli, Italy, since 2008

== Sources ==
- (Google Maps)
