= Martellago =

- Comune
- Comune di Martellago
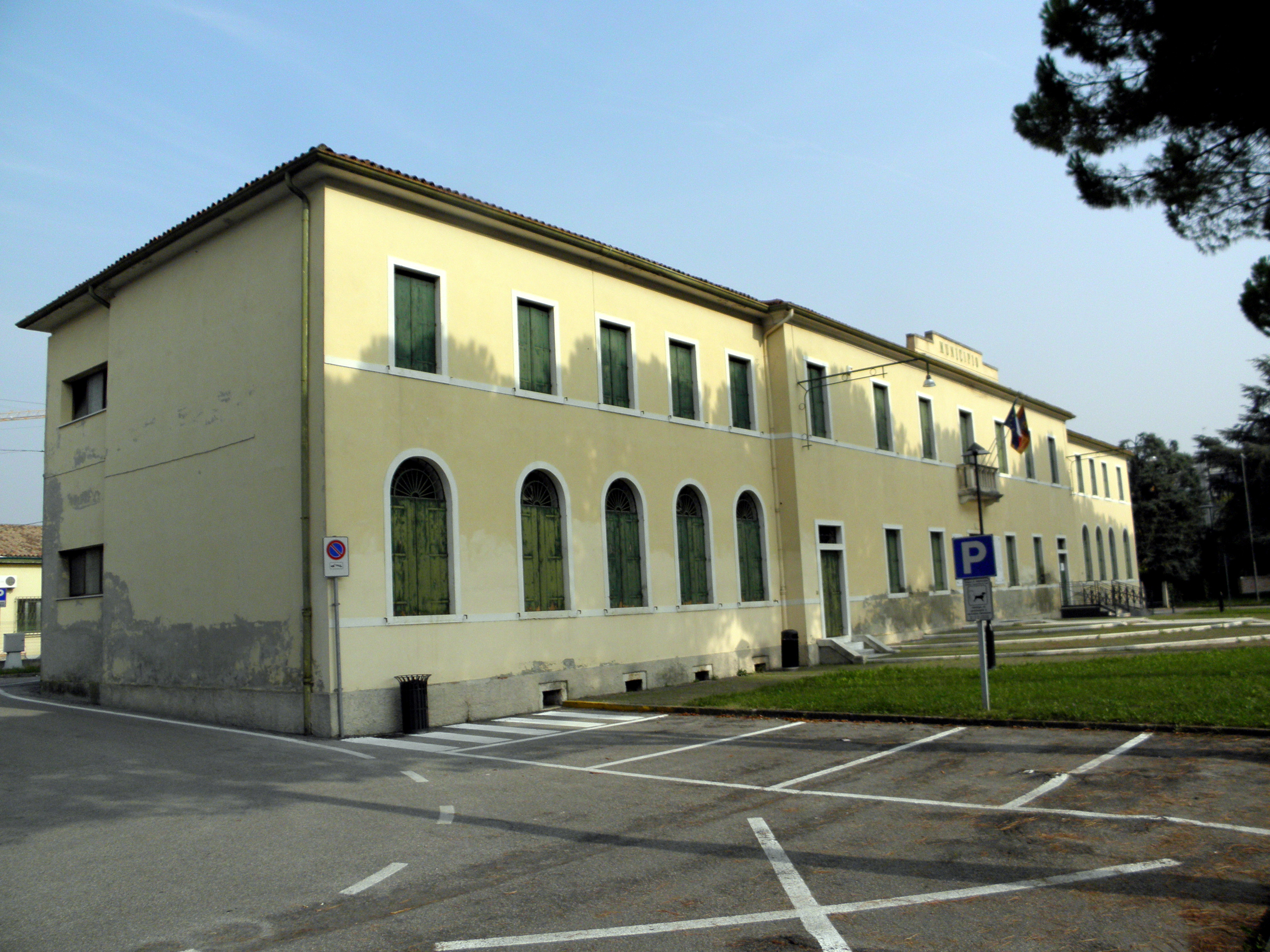
- Town hall

- Coat of arms

- Location within Italy Location within Veneto
- Coordinates: 45°33′N 12°10′E
- Country: Italy
- Region: Veneto
- Metropolitan city: Venice (VE)
- Frazioni: Maerne, Olmo

Government
  - Mayor: Andrea Saccarola

Area
  - Total: 20 km^{2} (7.7 sq mi)
- Elevation: 12 m (39 ft)

Population (31 December 2009)
  - Total: 21,223
  - Density: 1,100/km^{2} (2,700/sq mi)
- Demonym: Martellacensi
- Time zone: UTC+1 (CET)
  - Summer (DST): UTC+2 (CEST)
- Postal code: 30030
- Dialing code: 041
- Patron saint: St. Stephen
- Saint day: December 26
- Website: Official website

Martellago is a comune (municipality) in the Metropolitan City of Venice, in the Italian region of Veneto. It is about 15 kilometres (9 mi) northwest of Venice.
