= Gruaro =

- Comune
- Comune di Gruaro
- Coat of arms

- Location within Italy Location within Veneto
- Coordinates: 45°50′N 12°50′E
- Country: Italy
- Region: Veneto
- Metropolitan city: Venice (VE)
- Frazioni: Bagnara, Boldara, Giai, La Sega, Malcanton, Mondina, Roncis

Government
  - Mayor: Giacomo Gasparotto

Area
  - Total: 17.24 km^{2} (6.66 sq mi)
- Elevation: 10 m (33 ft)

Population (31 December 2008)
  - Total: 2,786
  - Density: 161.6/km^{2} (418.5/sq mi)
- Demonym: Gruaresi
- Time zone: UTC+1 (CET)
  - Summer (DST): UTC+2 (CEST)
- Postal code: 30020
- Dialing code: 0421
- Website: Official website

Gruaro is a town and comune in the Metropolitan City of Venice (Metropolitan City of Venice is an administration area), Veneto, Italy.

Gruaro is a medieval origin town in the eastern Veneto countryside near the border with Friuli. The area is rich of canals and water, such as the Lemene river and the Versiola minor river.

In 1294, a Eucharistic Miracle happened in Gruaro. On a tablecloth, from the Church of San Giusto, blood stains were produced by a consecrated affirma remained among the folds of the fabric. Today the relic is custodied in Valvasone's church (a bigger town north of Gruaro) for the will of the feudal lords of that time. From then, Gruaro is a long stage of different pilgrimages. In the frazione of Bagnara there was a castle, destroyed in Middle Ages. In Bagnara there is a 700 year-old church with unique frescoes and a 100 year-old pipe organ.

The neighboring municipality of Portogruaro took part of its name from Gruaro. The town of Portogruaro, which rises on the banks of the Lemene river, was originally the port of Gruaro for trades, which later became independent.

Gruaro is west of road SS463, east of the motorway A28 and south of the Friuli's border.

== Sources ==
- (Google Maps)
