= Dolo, Veneto =

Dolo
- Comune
- Comune di Dolo
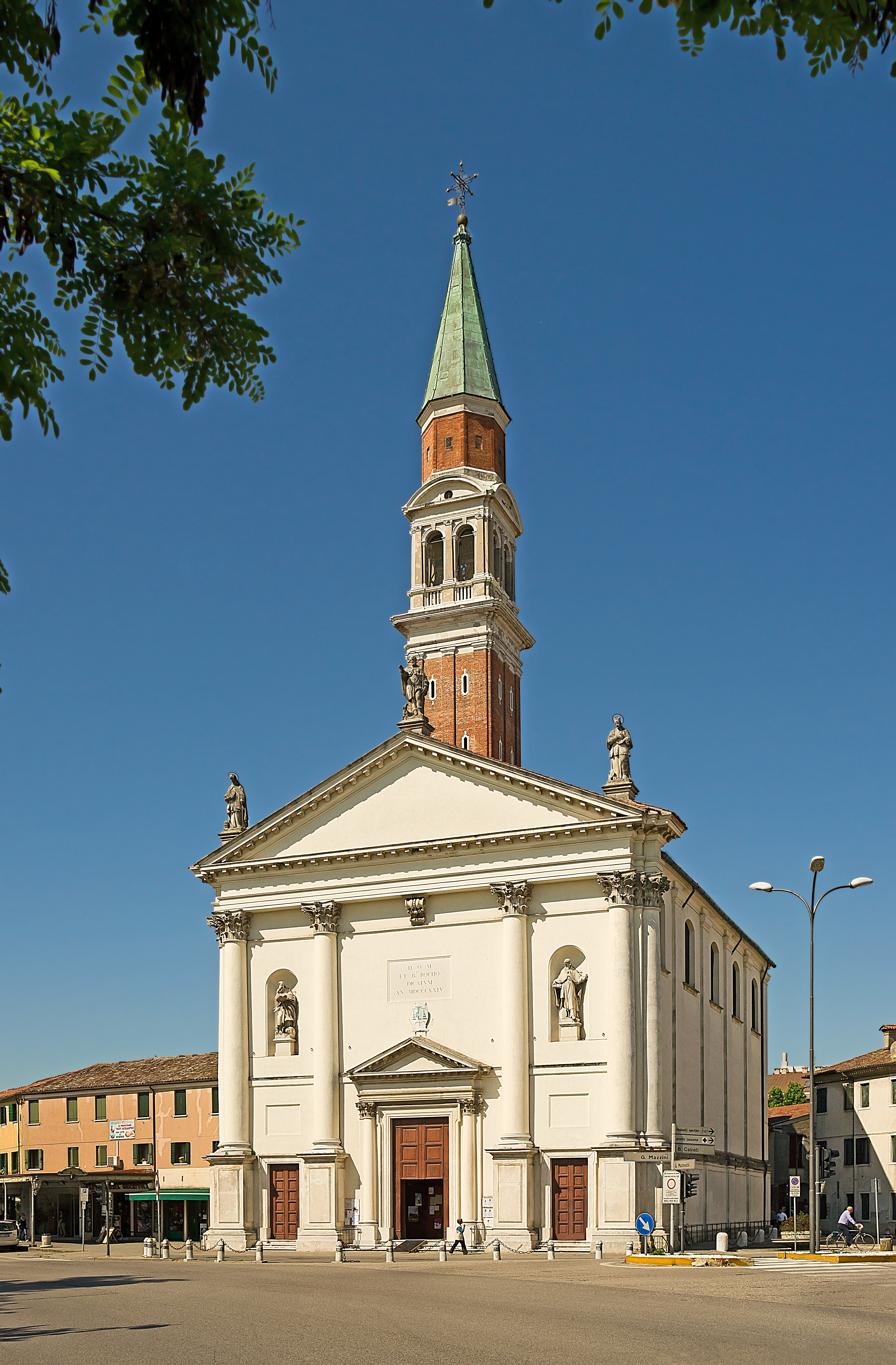
- San Rocco
- Interactive map of Dolo
- Location within Italy Location within Veneto
- Coordinates: 45°25′37″N 12°04′31″E
- Country: Italy
- Region: Veneto
- Metropolitan city: Venice (VE)
- Frazioni: Arino, Sambruson

Government
  - Mayor: Gianluigi Naletto

Area
  - Total: 24.08 km^{2} (9.30 sq mi)
- Elevation: 7 m (23 ft)

Population (31 December 2010)
  - Total: 15,188
  - Density: 630.7/km^{2} (1,634/sq mi)
- Demonym: Dolesi
- Time zone: UTC+1 (CET)
  - Summer (DST): UTC+2 (CEST)
- Postal code: 30031
- Dialing code: 041
- Patron saint: Saint Roch
- Saint day: 16 August
- Website: Official website

Dolo is a town and comune in the Metropolitan City of Venice, Veneto, Italy. It is connected by the SP26 provincial road and is one of the towns of the Riviera del Brenta.

== History ==
The growth of the town of Dolo is due to the gradual downsizing of the maritime power of Venice which was historically oriented towards Dalmatia, the Aegean Sea and the Middle East, which occurred concurrently with the fall of the Byzantine Empire, the Islamic expansion and the new opening of navigation routes to the Americas. As a consequence, Venice had to address inland its new commercial interests.

At the beginning of the 15th century, documents testify to the existence of a village which, developing, gave rise to the economic importance of Dolo, always linked to the presence of its water mills collecting wheat from the nearby agricultural lands and then grinding the flour and embarking some into cargo boats pulled by horses along the banks of the Brenta Canal to the lagoon, from where they continued directly up to the Venice island settlement.

Drinking water, too, was carried from Dolo to the centre of Venice by cargo boats with big barrels filled directly from the springs of the little river Seriola.

The territory was affected by massive hydraulic works that led to the diversion of the main bed of the river Brenta through an artificial canal with new mouths along the southern sea approaches of the port of Chioggia, while just one part of the old Brenta still flows into the lagoon near Fusina.

The purpose of these hydraulic works was primarily to prevent the progressive flooding of the lagoon by the freshwater of the rivers and thus maintain a high degree of salinity necessary to make the navigation and the very existence of Venice possible. Until 1405, the jurisdiction of Dolo was under Padua, and then passed definitely under the dominion of Venice.

A boat, called the Burchiello, transported Venetian noblemen directly to the Riviera sailing along the river Brenta, which was considered a natural extension of the Grand Canal, to spend the summer in the villas.

An old marble table still on display nearby lists the toll levied for transiting through the locks for each type of boat coming from or going to Padua.

The origin of the name Dolo is quite uncertain and controversial. One theory asserts the name is a contraction of "Dandolo", the surname of a noble Venetian family who gave a doge to the city of Venice and had properties here. From old maps, it appears that the town’s name was sometimes reported as Dollo, which in archaic Italian language could also mean a tower which was probably demolished thereafter unless it refers to the church’s belfry which is the highest in the region of Veneto, second only to St. Mark’s belfry in Venice.

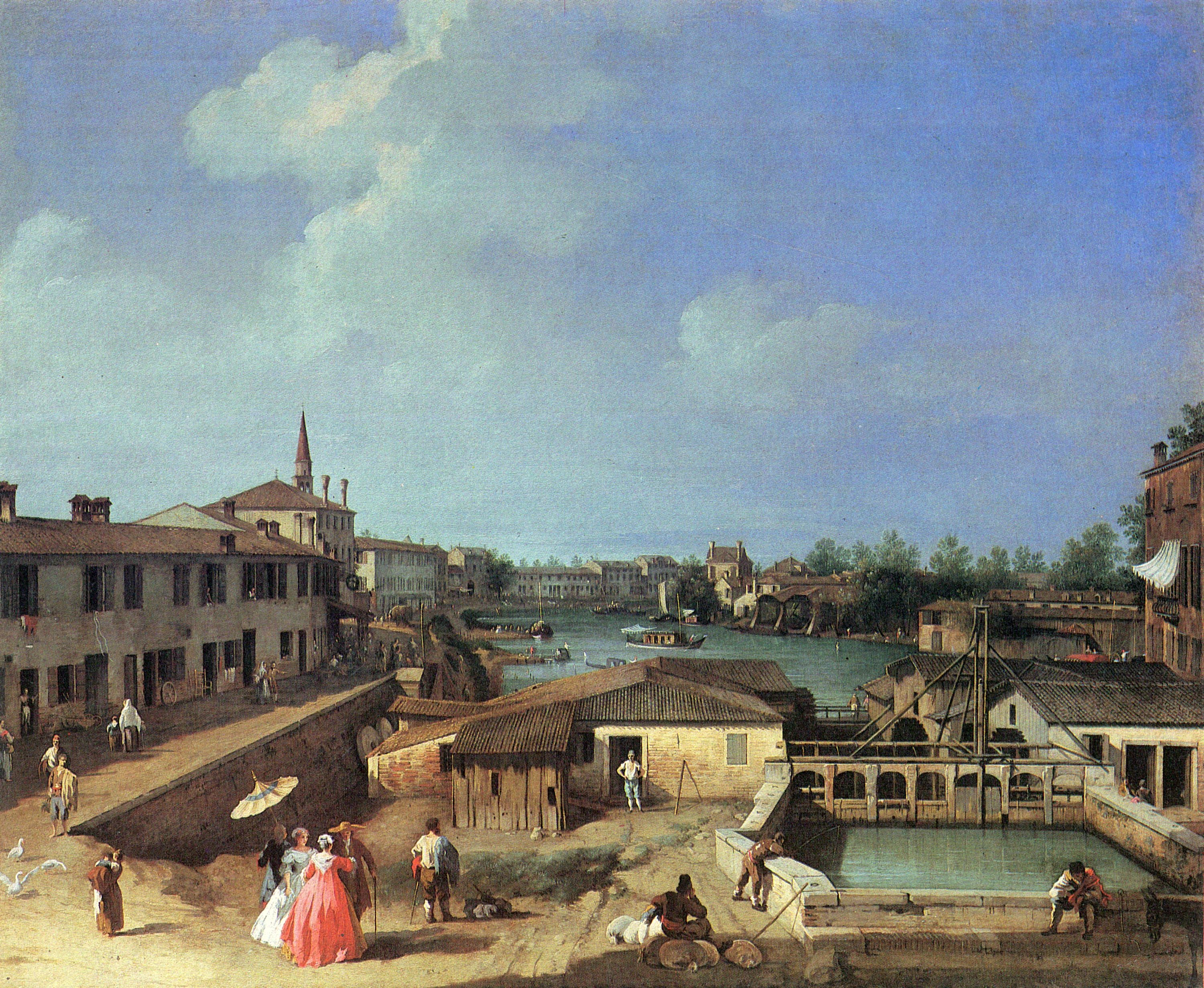
Les rescloses de Dolo

== 2015 tornado ==
On July 8, 2015, the town was impacted by a devastating F4 tornado. Initially touching down in Pianiga at 17:25 CEST, the tornado grew in size and strengthened as it moved southeastward. The tornado then hit Dolo, causing high-end F3 to low-end F4 damage. In Dolo, many buildings were severely damaged or leveled, with several buildings sustaining F4 damage. Vehicles were mangled and tossed into buildings, fields & into the river. One person was killed when their car was thrown and severely mangled as the tornado exited the town. In the 11 km the tornado tracked, 72 were injured and 1 was killed. Damage totals were at around €100 million.

== Sources ==
- (Google Maps)
