= Campagna Lupia =

- Comune
- Comune di Campagna Lupia
- Coat of arms

- Location within Italy Location within Veneto
- Coordinates: 45°21′N 12°6′E
- Country: Italy
- Region: Veneto
- Metropolitan city: Venice (VE)
- Frazioni: Lova, Lughetto Località: Lugo

Government
  - Mayor: Natin Alberto

Area
  - Total: 87 km^{2} (34 sq mi)
- Elevation: 4 m (13 ft)

Population (30 September 2015)
  - Total: 7,152
  - Density: 82/km^{2} (210/sq mi)
- Demonym: Campagnalupiesi
- Time zone: UTC+1 (CET)
  - Summer (DST): UTC+2 (CEST)
- Postal code: 30010
- Dialing code: 041
- ISTAT code: 027002
- Patron saint: Saint Peter
- Saint day: 29 June
- Website: Official website

Campagna Lupia (kam-PAN-nyah-LOOP-yah) is a town in the province of Venice, Veneto, north-eastern Italy.

== Sources ==
- (Google Maps)
