= Cinto Caomaggiore =

- Comune
- Comune di Cinto Caomaggiore
- Coat of arms

- Location within Italy Location within Veneto
- Coordinates: 45°50′N 12°47′E
- Country: Italy
- Region: Veneto
- Metropolitan city: Venice (VE)
- Frazioni: il Bando, San Biagio, Settimo

Government
  - Mayor: Gianluca Falcomer

Area
  - Total: 21 km^{2} (8.1 sq mi)
- Elevation: 11 m (36 ft)

Population (2008)
  - Total: 3,281
  - Density: 160/km^{2} (400/sq mi)
- Demonym: Cintesi
- Time zone: UTC+1 (CET)
  - Summer (DST): UTC+2 (CEST)
- Postal code: 30020
- Dialing code: 0421
- ISTAT code: 027009
- Patron saint: St. Blaise
- Saint day: 3 February
- Website: Official website

Cinto Caomaggiore is a comune (municipality) in the Metropolitan City of Venice, in the Italian region of Veneto. SS251 goes through it.
