= Pramaggiore =

- Comune
- Comune di Pramaggiore
- Location within Italy Location within Veneto
- Coordinates: 45°49′N 12°44′E
- Country: Italy
- Region: Veneto
- Metropolitan city: Venice (VE)
- Frazioni: Blessaglia, Belfiore, Salvarolo

Area
  - Total: 24 km^{2} (9.3 sq mi)

Population (2008)
  - Total: 4,670
  - Density: 190/km^{2} (500/sq mi)
- Demonym: Pramaggioresi or pramaggiorensi
- Time zone: UTC+1 (CET)
  - Summer (DST): UTC+2 (CEST)
- Postal code: 30020
- Dialing code: 0421
- ISTAT code: 027030
- Website: Official website

Pramaggiore is a comune (municipality) in the Metropolitan City of Venice, in the Italian region of Veneto. It is north of SR53.
