= Teglio Veneto =

- Comune
- Comune di Teglio Veneto
- Coat of arms

- Location within Italy Location within Veneto
- Coordinates: 45°49′N 12°53′E
- Country: Italy
- Region: Veneto
- Metropolitan city: Venice (VE)
- Frazioni: Cintello, Suzzolins

Government
  - Mayor: Andrea Tamai

Area
  - Total: 11.52 km^{2} (4.45 sq mi)
- Elevation: 9 m (30 ft)

Population (2008)
  - Total: 2,276
  - Density: 197.6/km^{2} (511.7/sq mi)
- Demonym: Tegliesi
- Time zone: UTC+1 (CET)
  - Summer (DST): UTC+2 (CEST)
- Postal code: 30025
- Dialing code: 0421
- ISTAT code: 027040
- Website: Official website

Teglio Veneto (Friulian: Tei, Venetian: Tejo Vèneto) is a town in the Metropolitan City of Venice, Veneto, Italy.

Located south of SP18, the town was mentioned for the first time in an 1187 document. Its name derives from that of the Tilia tree, once widespread in the area.
