= Art Aia - Creatives In Residence =

Art residency in Italy

Art Aia - Creatives / In / Residence
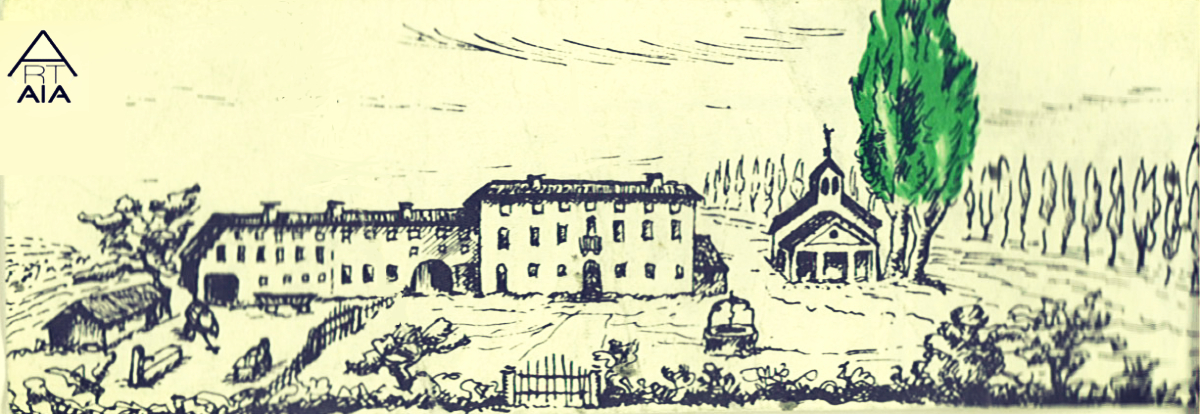

- Location within Italy
- Location: Sesto al Reghena
- Coordinates: 45°51′33″N 12°28′17″E

Art Aia - Creatives / In / Residence is a former agricultural center turned into an international art residency in the Italian province of Pordenone, Friuli-Venezia Giulia, in the surroundings of the village of Sesto al Reghena. The artist-run organization is committed to nurturing the creative process, and it fosters artistic production and research, especially towards ecology and sustainability.

== Background and history ==
Art Aia – Creatives / In / Residence is located in the locality of Banduzzo. In the military cartography of Anton von Zach (Kriegskarte, 1798-1805. Duchy of Venetia), it is possible to detect in this area the presence of an isolated building. The complex belonged to the Counts Bion of Padua, who bought it at the end of the eighteenth century from the Abbey of Santa Maria in Sylvis. From the mid-nineteenth century, the country estate belongs to a branch of the Morassutti family who used it has an agricultural center during the Metayage and restored the Small Church of St. Anthony of Padua in 1850.

== Today ==
Art Aia – Creatives / In / Residence operates at a local and international level via artist in residence programs open to individual artists, and multidisciplinary art collectives, such as the Institut für Alles Mögliche of Berlin and has organized courses taught by teaching artists like John Strasberg, and Italo-Palestinian artist Mustafa Sabbagh who taught a photography workshop in 2014.

The fact that people come to a place, where everyone makes that commitment, and they are in the country just changes the atmosphere of work so there is a kind of relaxation and camaraderie that is very special. It is a special place.

— John Strasberg

In 2014 Art Aia has created a subsidiary in Berlin, La Dolce Berlin, an artist-run space and film production company located in the area of Wedding. Since 2018 Art Aia – Creatives / In / Residence has been collaborating with the American organization Centre for Sustainable Practice in the Arts (CSPA) in the ATE: Residency in Sustainable Practice, and in Climate Change Theatre Action 2021, a worldwide series of readings and performances of short climate change plays presented biennially to coincide with the United Nations COP meetings, where the Italian venue has organized a multidisciplinary event by the Tagliamento river, together with Legambiente and the Regional Environmental Protection Agency.

Due to COVID-19 pandemic, the venue partnered with the TransCultural Exchange supporting the online project Hello World and also with Uronto Artist Community affiliated with Art Initiative Bangladesh-AIB.

In 2020 Art Aia – Creatives / In / Residence became part of Google Arts & Culture as a cultural institute located in the region Friuli-Venezia Giulia.

== See also ==
- Small Church of St. Anthony of Padua (Sesto al Reghena)
- Morassutti family
