= Cristoforo Diana =

Italian painter (1543–1636)

Cristoforo Diana (1543 – 1636) was an Italian painter active in his native San Vito al Tagliamento.

== Works ==
- Portrait of Oristilla Partistagno, 1573, villa Toppo, Buttrio;
- Crucifixion, San Vito al Tagliamento, numero civico 195;
- Holy Family, San Vito al Tagliamento,;
- Gonfalone for the Scuola di san Tommaso, 1575, Portogruaro
- St Valentino, 1578, Abbey of Santa Maria in Sylvis, Sesto al Reghena;
- Frescoes, 1587, now Parish church of Settimo;
- Altarpiece, 1587, parish church of San Stino;
- Frescoes 1590, now Church of Floriano, San Giovanni di Casarsa;
- Gonfalone or banner, 1591, parish church of Prodolone;
- Altarpiece, 1593, parrocchiale di Prodolone;
- St Martin and two saints, 1593, casa Colossi at San Vito al Tagliamento;
- Altarpiece, 1594, parish church of Giussago;
- Gonfalone, 1598, parish church of Cordovado;
- other, 1611, parish of Meduno;
- Gonfalone for the scuola of St Valentino, 1612, parish church of Gleris;
- Holy Trinity with Saints, 1615, parish church of Villanova della Cartera.

== Bibliography ==
- Dizionario Biografico Italiano, entry on Cristoforo Diana, by Paolo Goi, 1991, volume 39, accessed = 13 August 2012.
