= Small Church of St. Anthony of Padua (Sesto al Reghena) =

- Chiesetta votiva di S.Antonio da Padova
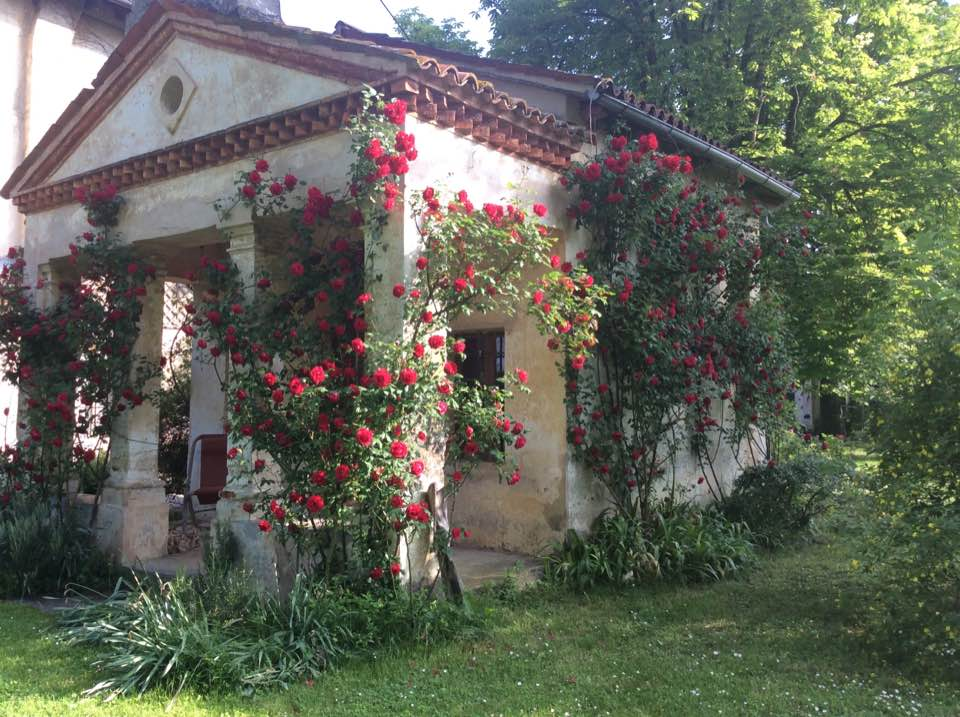

Religion
- Affiliation: Catholic
- Province: Pordenone
- Region: Friuli-Venezia Giulia
- Rite: Catholic
- Patron: Saint Anthony

Location
- Country: Italy

The small Church of St. Anthony of Padua is a Catholic Church in a country estate near the Comune of Sesto al Reghena in Friuli-Venezia Giulia. The main façade is enriched by the presence of a rectangular portico, delimited by a small wall on which rest two lateral pillars and two central columns which support the triangular tympanum. The entrance door is flanked by two rectangular windows. Inside the Church there is the altar-piece which represents Saint John the Baptist and Saint Antony of Padua.

== History ==
The complex where the Church stands belonged to the Noble Family Bion from Padua, who bought it at the end of the eighteenth century from the Abbey of Santa Maria in Sylvis. According to the military cartography of Anton von Zach during 1850 it can be seen in this area the presence of an isolated building, without annexes. From the mid-nineteenth century the property belonged to the Morassutti family, which used it as an agricultural business center.
