= Abbey of Santa Maria del Pero =

Coordinates: 12.4195°N 12.4194°E

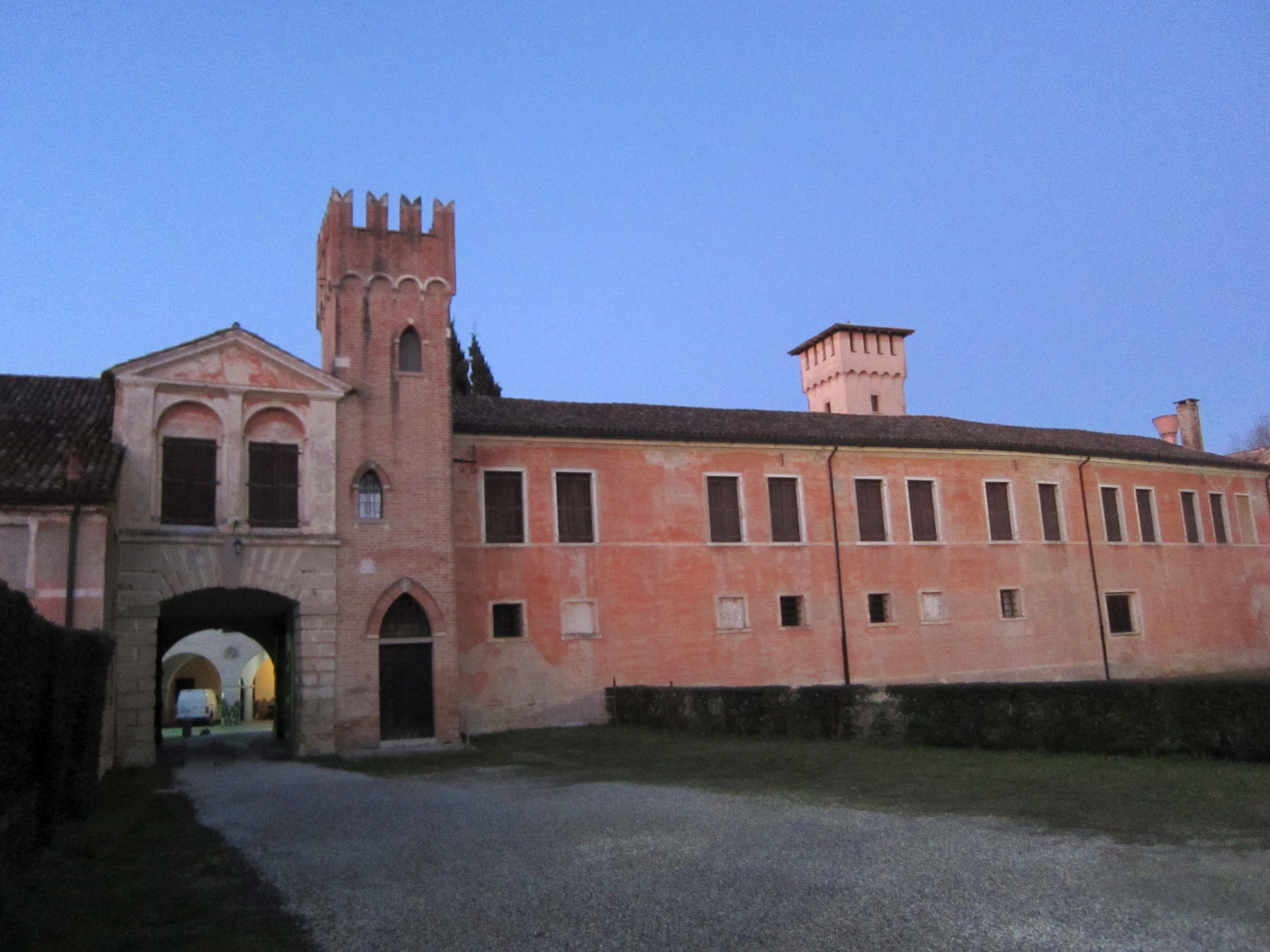
Abbazia di Santa Maria del Pero today

The Abbazia di Monastier or Abbey of Santa Maria del Pero is located in Monastier di Treviso, province of Treviso, in the northeast Italian region of Veneto. This abbey was originally dedicated to Saint Peter, then re-named Santa Maria del Pero (Our Lady of the Pero). The Pero is the ancient name for the Meolo river.

== History ==
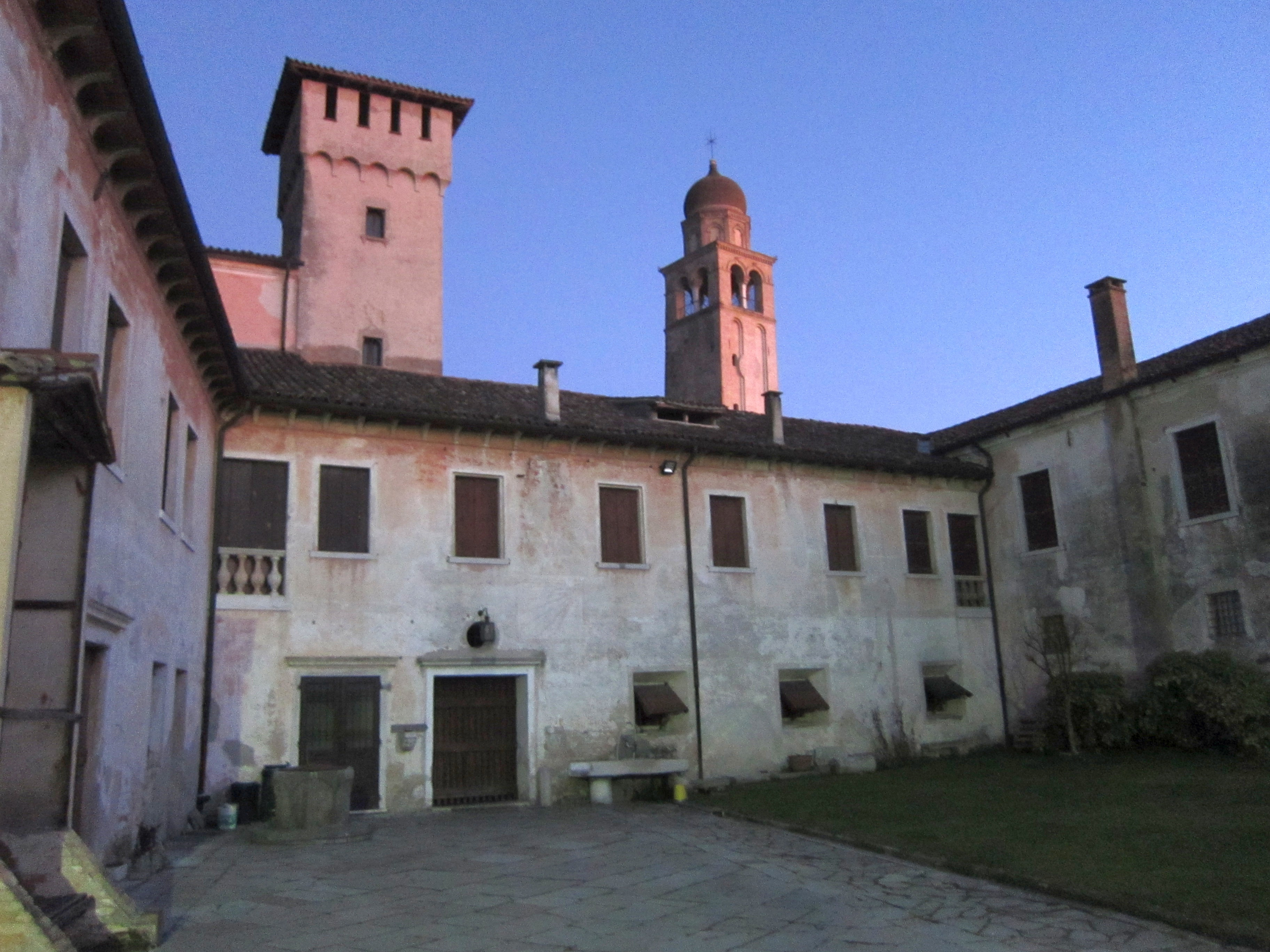
Courtyard

The abbey was founded in 958 by the Benedictines. Holy Roman Emperor, Otto I, donated the lands and chartered the abbey. This documentation does not survive; it is believed destroyed during attacks by the Magyars in the 10th and 11th centuries. The original donation reflected lands located between the Vallio and Meolo rivers. Henry II in 1017 confirmed these donations made to the monastery by his predecessor. Along with the donations the privileges of the monastery were noted:

- the monastery would be under direct protection of the Emperor, and
- the monastery was granted:
  - the village of San Paolo and the chapel of San Martino
  - the farms (each farm supported a family of settlers), houses, lands, vineyards, meadows, pastures, woods, hunting rights, fisheries, mills, roads and the income and revenues of the grants.

These lands had been part of the Marca Veronensis et Aquileiensis (frontier) between Italy (under the control of the Carolingians) and Central Europe or (in this case) independent Venice. The original location was a river port on the Meolo river, which could supply Venice with trade goods and thereby generate income in this area. This harbor was called the Portus Pirensis.

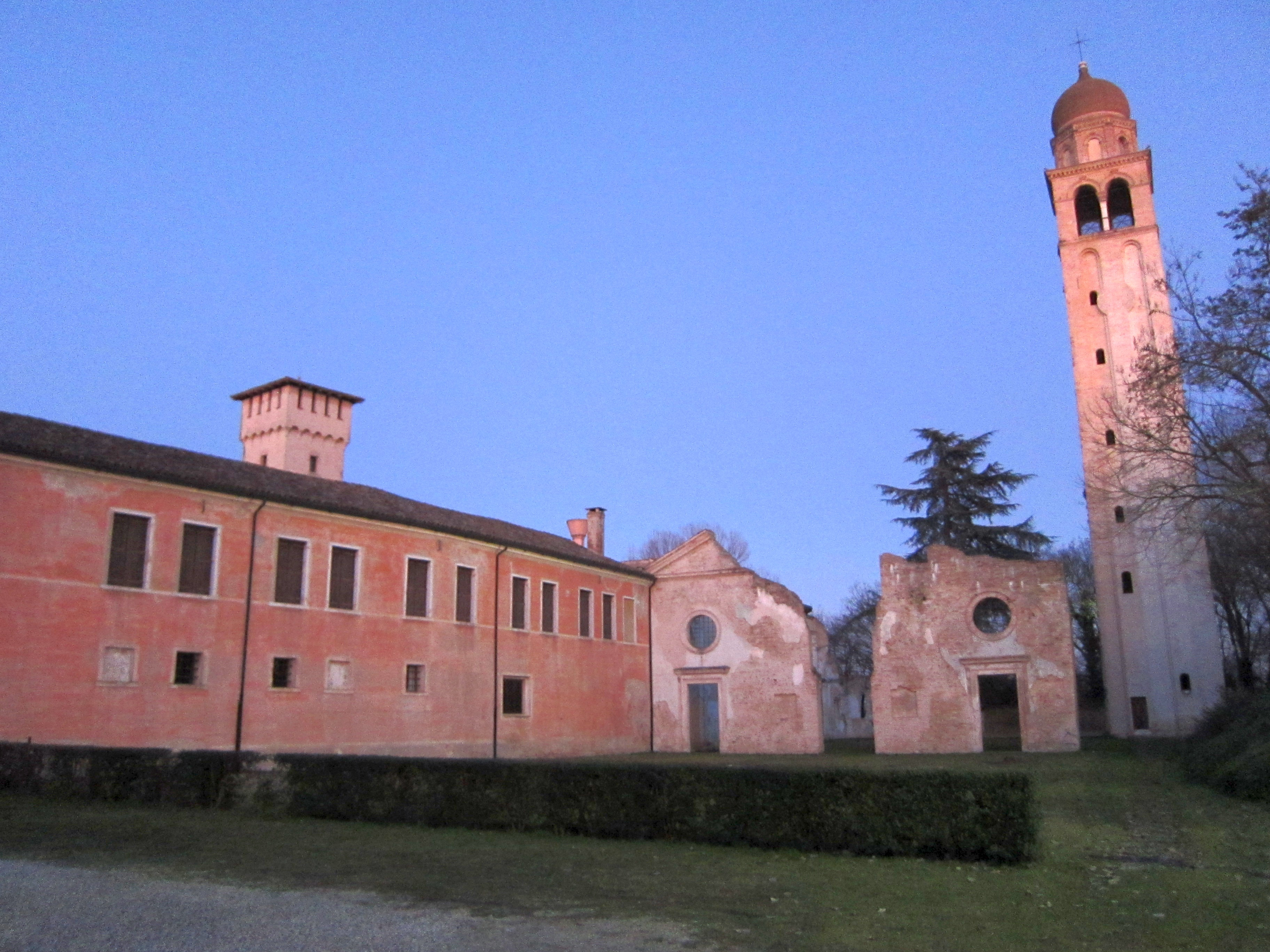
Campanile

Through the port the most important trade good would have been lumber, which was abundant in the area of Monastier and the mainland in general. Wood was needed by the Venetians as building material and fuel. However, this territory was controlled for the Emperor by the Patriarch of Aquileia, and lumber had to be traded.

Otto I wanted the marches area stabilized by people he could trust. An effective way of accomplishing this was to found monasteries and grant them the land so that they rather than a secular lord could hold it for him. Settlers would then come and farm the land for the monks, thereby creating a stable economy and agricultural society. The monks were under direct protection of the Emperor. Anyone attacking the monastery could expect to be heavily fined and even attacked by the imperial army. This was an effective way to stop marauders and warring families in the Middle Ages. It is in the light of this management of the frontier by Otto I that the abbey was established. It was part of a monastic building campaign carried out in the regions of the Veneto and Friuli-Venezia Giulia. Two others foundations during this time and in this vicinity are the monastery Santa Maria di Mogliano (South-East of Treviso) in 997 and Sesto al Reghena in the 9th century in Friuli-Venezia.

The abbey church was first dedicated to Saint Peter, hence the abbey was known as Abbazia di San Pietro. It was re-dedicated to the Virgin Mary in the mid-12th century. On March 13, 1200, the nobleman Ezzelino II da Romano, who was also the Podestà of Treviso, granted the abbey the rights and privileges to the entire area between the rivers Vallio and Piave, thus greatly extending its domain.

Over the next centuries the Veneto was absorbed by the Republic of Venice. In 1493, the abbot of San Giorgio Maggiore in Venice enlarged the abbey and constructed an elevation to the cloister, an upper floor with mullioned windows. Subsequently, various events saw the abbey grow until the early 1700s, reaching its greatest extent. It was dissolved by Napoleon and the property sold in 1838 to Count Ninni. However, the church there remained active.

During the First World War, the abbey became a Relief Center and Soldier's Hospital. Ernest Hemingway served here. However, the campanile was used as a lookout post for observing the enemy positions. For this reason, the church was targeted in one of the many bombardments of 1917 and 1918 and then almost completely destroyed during the shelling for the Battle of the Solstice.

== Abbey today ==
Work was undertake to repair the war-damaged structure to permit it to be used once more for worship. Unfortunately, the severe extent of the damage led to abandonment of the attempt. Subsequently, during the 1920s, new church, Santa Maria Assunta, was constructed in Fornaci. Today only the main façade and the wall adjacent to the convent remain, as well as the campanile. The cloisters and campanile of the abbey of Santa Maria del Pero (under private ownership) were renovated in 1997. The site is now a venue for weddings, concerts and other events.
