= Giovanni Cornaro (cardinal) =

Italian cardinal (1720–1789)

Giovanni Cornaro (30 June 1720 – 29 March 1789) was an Italian cardinal.

== Biography ==
The son of Niccolò Cornaro and Alba Giustiniani, Cornaro belonged to the San Maurizio branch of the patrician Cornaro family of Venice.

He was protonotary apostolic from 1742, a member of the Apostolic Signatura from 1743, vice-legate in Bologna (1744-1747) and member of the Roman Rota for the Republic of Venice (from 21 March 1759). In 1765 he became subdeacon, and was subsequently governor of Rome and vice-Camerlengo of the Holy Roman Church (1775–1778). His other positions included that of lay abbot of Santa Maria in Sylvis, in Friuli.

He was created cardinal on 1 June 1778, with the titulum of San Cesareo in Palatio. Cornaro died in 1789, and was buried in the church of San Marco in Rome, though later his remains were moved to San Cesareo.

== See also ==
- Catholic Church in Italy
