= Morassutti family =

Italian family

Morassutti
- Patriarchal family
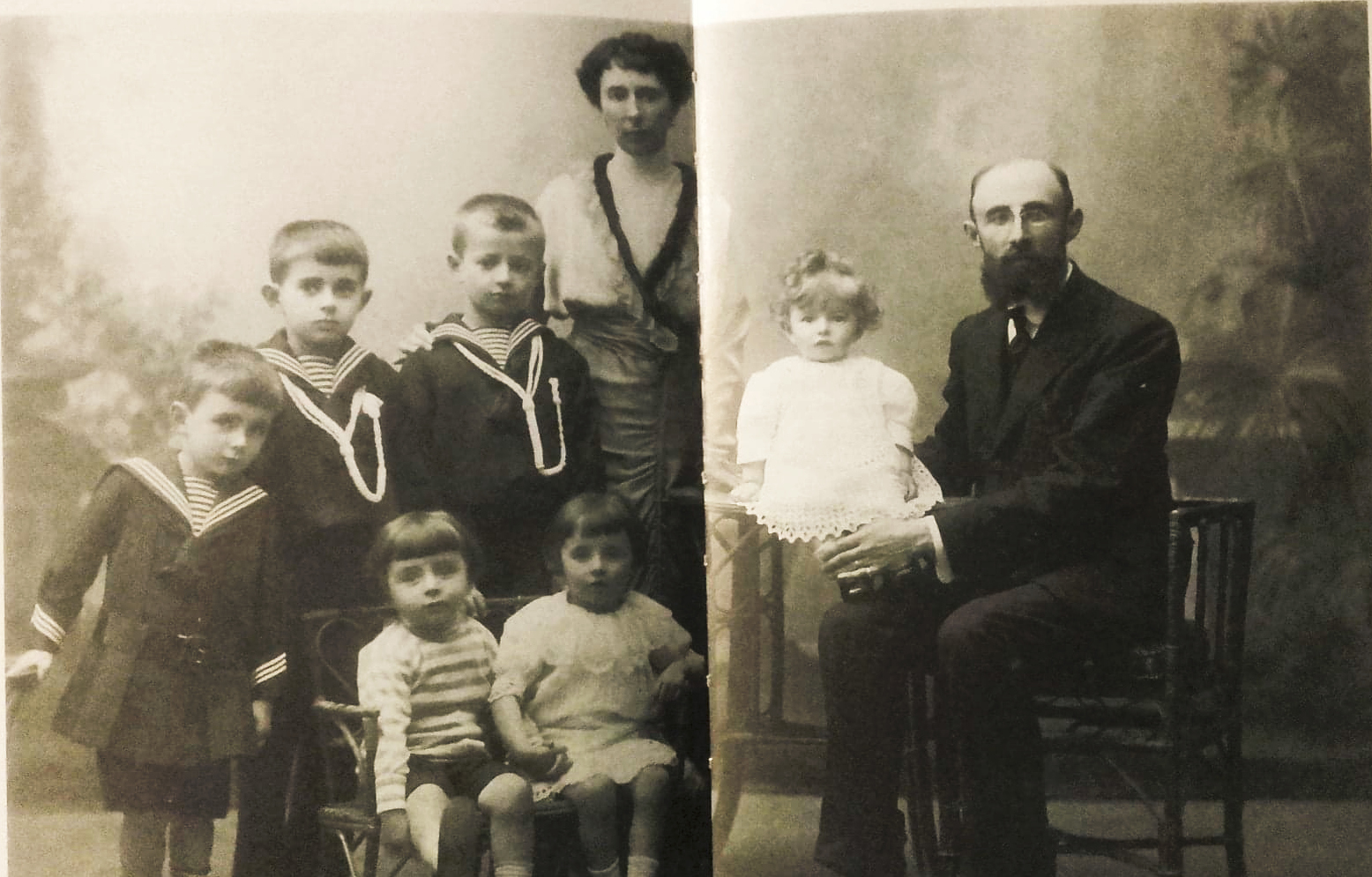
- Current region: Veneto, Friuli-Venezia Giulia
- Origin: San Vito al Tagliamento
- Founder: Angelo Paolo, b.1718

The Morassutti family is an Italian family, originally from Friuli-Venezia Giulia, that has been active in the wholesaler and retail hardware trade since the early nineteenth century. They are mostly known for having started one of the few distribution chain of hardware and household articles during the 1930s.

== Overview ==
The Morassutti family, active first in the trade of hardware and wood, then in the field of household objects constituted in Italy during the 20th century an innovative sales systems: both with the use of catalogs and service to the retailer as well as by proposing modern techniques of self-service and atypical franchising. The Paolo Morassutti company became a point of reference for the Italian hardware market and it retraced the growth hubs already experienced by the American wholesale trade. Their commercial strategy was characterized by product specialization, differentation in pricing policies according to the different geographical areas of Italy, retail stores chain and by transferring know-how of sales and management to retail customers, such as the use of stock management as well as a propensity for innovative marketing.

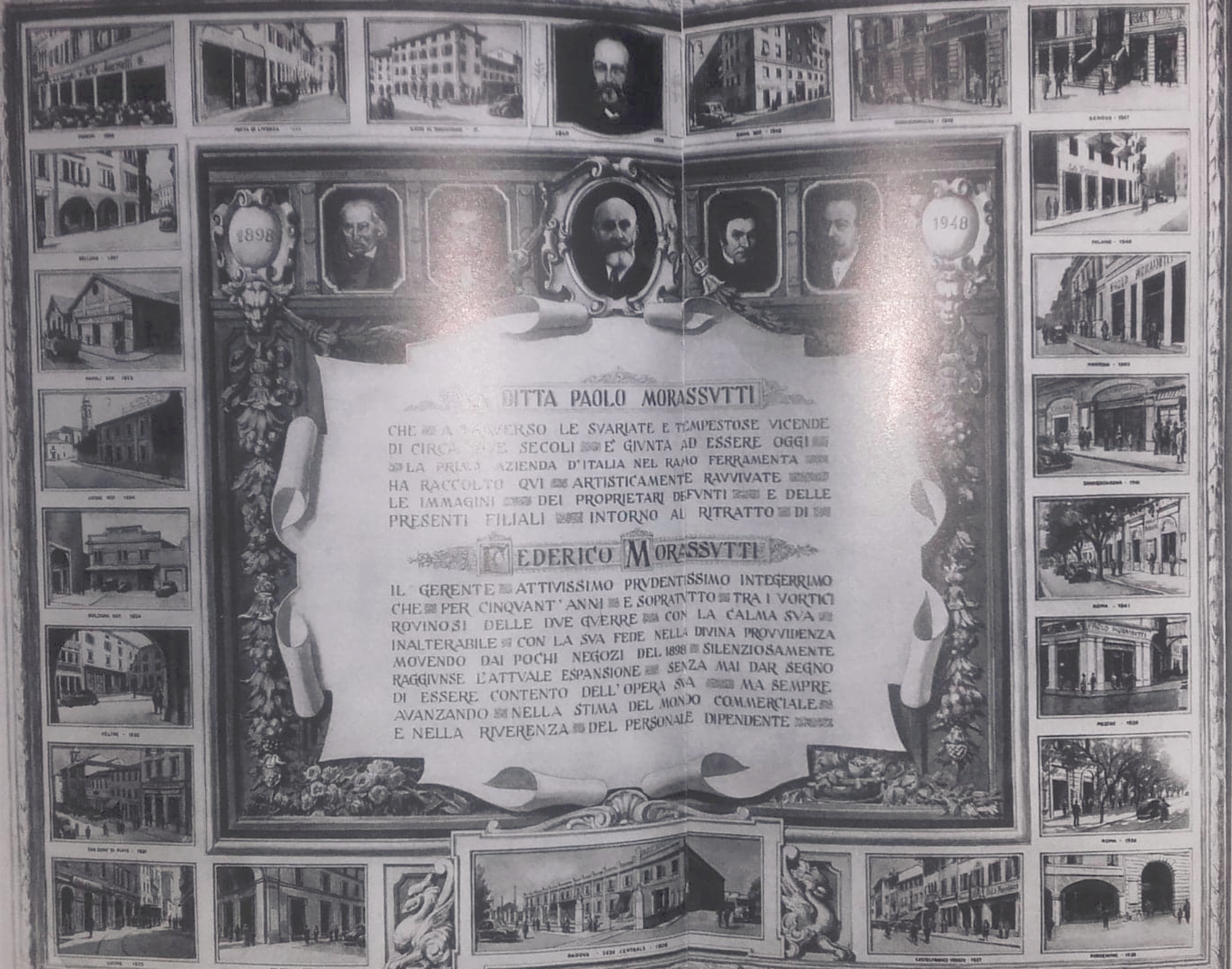
Print for the 70th birthday of Federico Morassutti

== Federico Morassutti ==
Federico Morassutti (22 October 1876 - 17 April 1954) was an Italian entrepreneur and philanthropist, a prominent member of the Morassutti family mostly known for his farsighted entrepreneurial choice of creating a network of shops, a veritable supply chain of long-lived consumer goods. In 1886, at the age of ten, Federico was sent to a boarding school in Cremona, and from there abroad, to Grenoble and Ljubljana, to perfect his education and gain experience in trade-related matters. During that time the family company was experiencing a period of uncertainty. In 1898, at the death of his father, the management of the company passed to Federico, twenty-two years old at that time, who initially devoted himself to consolidating the financial situation in order to grow by expanding from regional borders and by launching the company into the national market. The "Great War" considerably reduce the company's commercial activity, particularly in the retail sector but during the post-war years it was relaunched. New deposits were opened, first in Bologna and later in Naples placing the company at the forefront of the national panorama of the distribution sector. In 1922 The Paolo Morassutti was transformed into a collective company formed by Federico as the managing director and by his brothers Giovanni Paolo, Domenico and Antonio. From there to a few years, however, in conjunction with the general crisis of the thirties, different views emerge between the brothers. In the late thirties the company was booming and at the beginning of the fifties the company employed more than 500 employees, located in 21 stores. In 1952 the company itself changed its structure becoming a modern joint-stock company. During The Fifties, The Paolo Morassutti company, with a capital of 210 million lire, employed about 570 employees located in 24 settlements (20 stores and 4 depots) spread throughout the country: from Veneto to Lazio, from Liguria to Emilia, from Lombardy to Campania. Federico Morassutti died in Padua in the spring of 1954 after establishing his family business among the leading companies in the wholesaler distribution sector of Italy during the second half of the 20th century.

== Paolo Morassutti ==
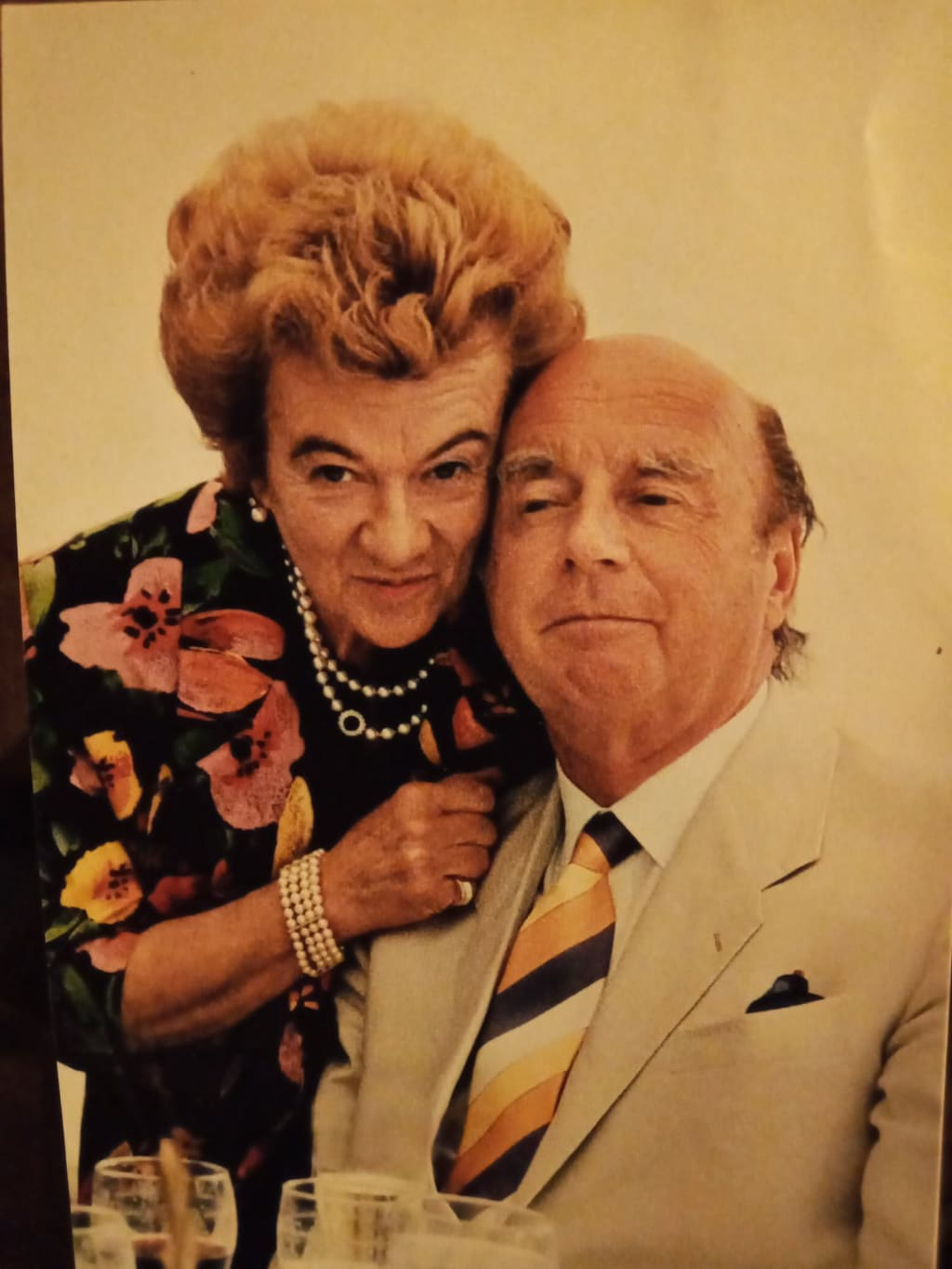
Paolo Morassutti with his wife

Paolo Morassutti was the youngest son of Federico Morassutti. Paolo was named by his mother Gianna Luchetti and his father Federico after his grandfather Paolo Morassutti. After managing several stores in Padua and working for his family business Paolo signed a commercial agreement in 1963 with Artur Fischer, owner of Fischerwerke and founded Fischer Italia to distribute throughout the country of Italy the plastic S-Plug which enables screws to be fastened into masonry substrate. The agreement was maintained until 2000.

He was known also for sponsoring several cultural and sport initiatives.

Paolo Morassutti died in Belluno on August 9, 2013. He was 86 years old.

== Archive ==
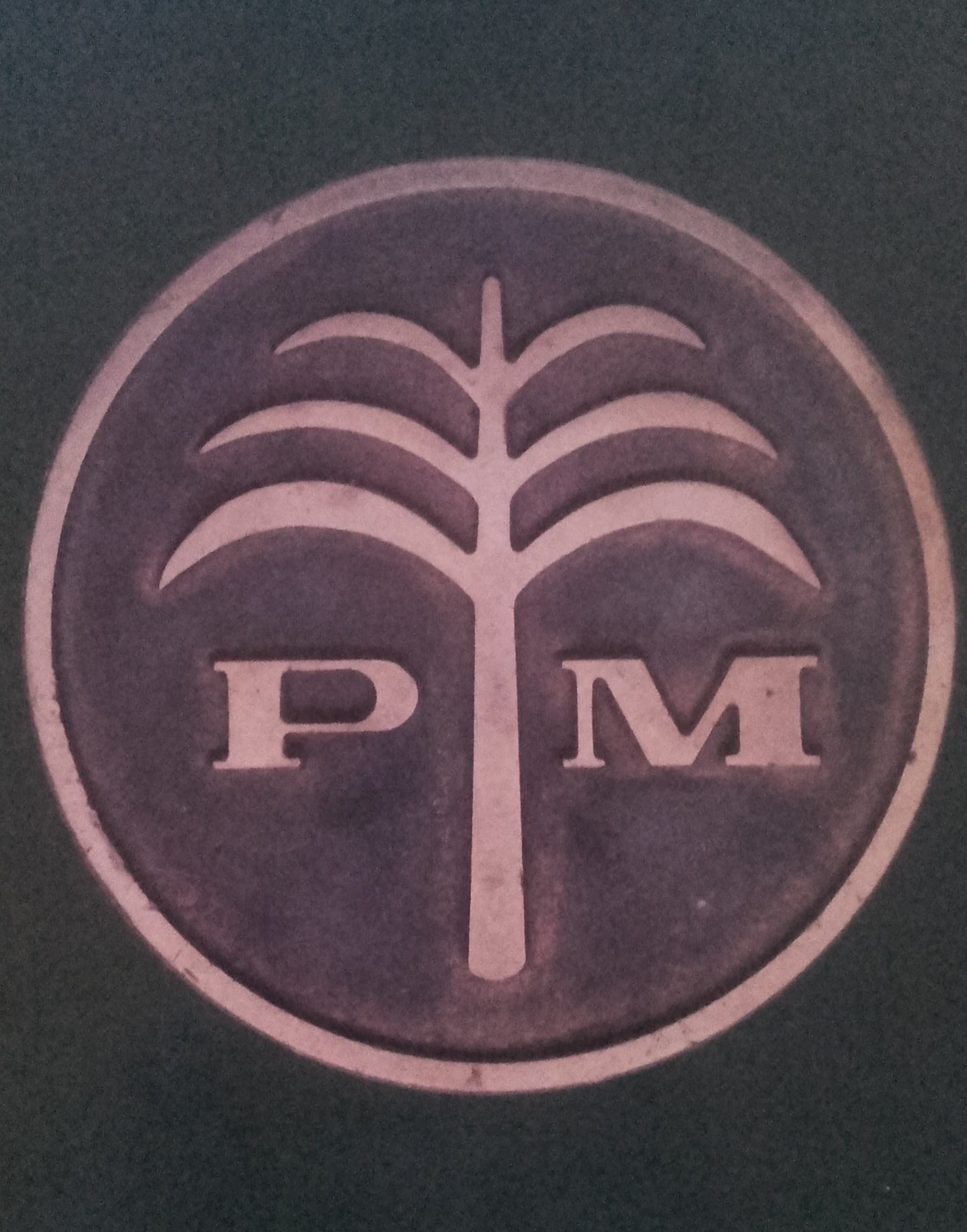
The Paolo Morassutti company logo

The Paolo Morassutti company archive has been missing after its absorption by La Rinascente group in the 1970s.

== Notable family members ==
- Bruno Morassutti (8 December 1920 – 4 September 2008), Italian architect. In 1949 Bruno Morassutti, son of Federico, attended the Taliesin Fellowship studying with American architect Frank Lloyd Wright, then moved to Milan to begin a partnership with Italian architect Angelo Mangiarotti realizing notable work like Casa a tre cilindri(1959-1962) among others.

== Bibliography ==
- Roverato, Giorgio (1993). Una famiglia e un caso imprenditoriale : I Morassutti (In Italian).4. Neri Pozza. ISBN 9788873054191
