= Sesto al Reghena =

Sesto al Reghena Siest (Friulian)
- Comune
- Comune di Sesto al Reghena
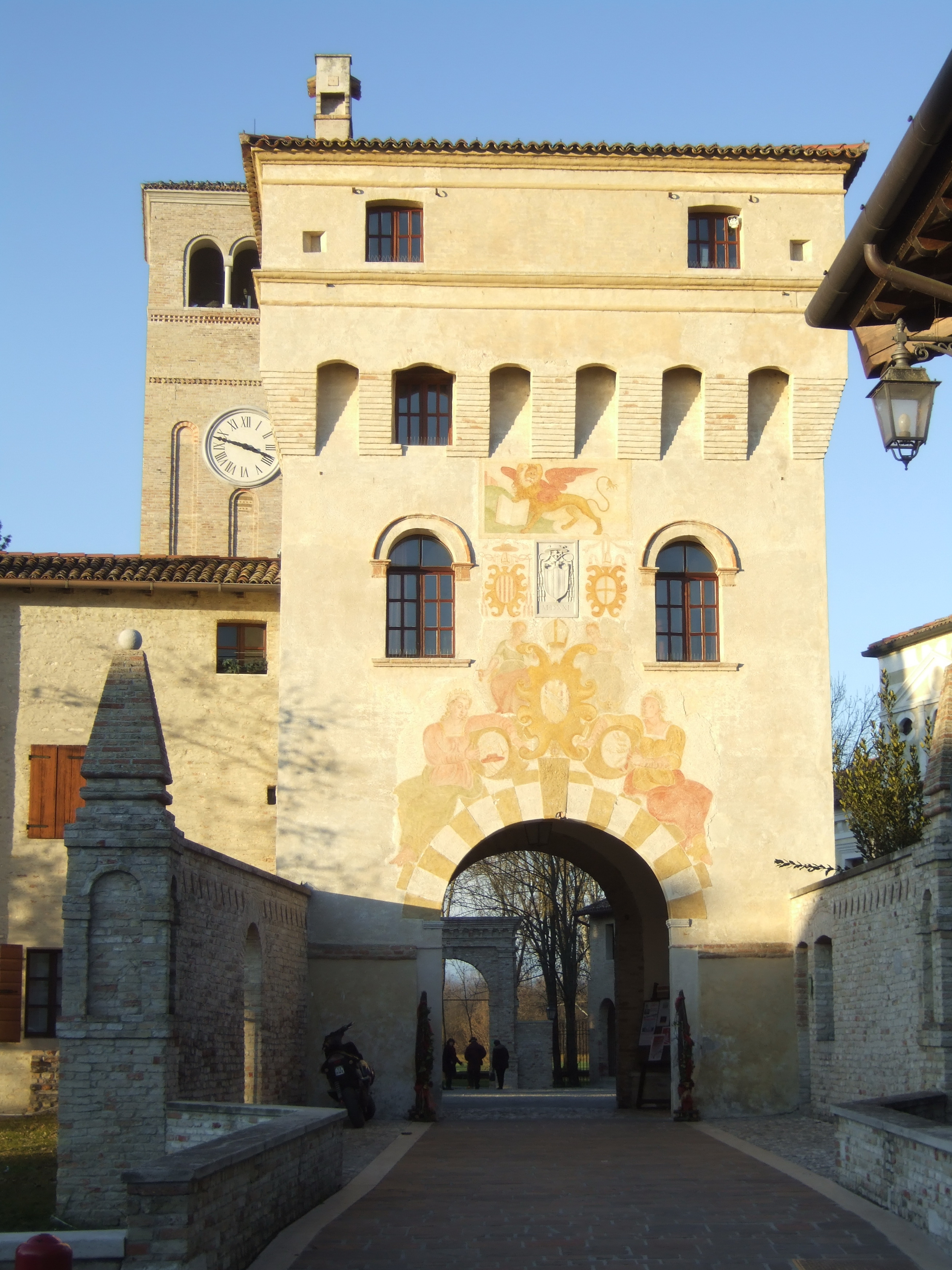
- The main gate of the abbey of Santa Maria in Sylvis

- Coat of arms

- Location within Italy Location within Friuli-Venezia Giulia
- Coordinates: 45°51′N 12°49′E
- Country: Italy
- Region: Friuli-Venezia Giulia
- Province: Pordenone (PN)
- Frazioni: Bagnarola, Ramuscello, Marignana

Government
  - Mayor: Ivo Chiarot

Area
  - Total: 40.5 km^{2} (15.6 sq mi)
- Elevation: 13 m (43 ft)

Population (31 December 2012)
  - Total: 6,393
  - Density: 158/km^{2} (409/sq mi)
- Time zone: UTC+1 (CET)
  - Summer (DST): UTC+2 (CEST)
- Postal code: 33079-33071-33070-33073
- Dialing code: 0434
- Website: Official website

Sesto al Reghena (Friulian: Siest) is a comune (municipality) in the Regional decentralization entity of Pordenone, in the Italian region of Friuli-Venezia Giulia, located in the lower Friulian-Venetian plain about 80 kilometres (50 mi) northwest of Trieste and about 20 kilometres (12 mi) southeast of Pordenone.

Sesto al Reghena borders the following municipalities: Chions, Cinto Caomaggiore, Cordovado, Gruaro, Morsano al Tagliamento, San Vito al Tagliamento. It is one of I Borghi più belli d'Italia ("The most beautiful villages of Italy").

== Main sights ==
Sights include:

- The Abbey of Santa Maria in Sylvis, a Benedictine monastery built in the 8th century
- Villa Freschi, a Venetian villa from the 18th century in the locality of Ramuscello
- All Saint's Church, a parish church from the 1300 located in Bagnarola
- The fountain of Venchiaredo, a literary place in Friuli, celebrated by Italian writer Ippolito Nievo and rediscovered by Italian poet Pier Paolo Pasolini
- Church of Saint Peter, originally medieval small church with a fresco of the fifteenth century portraying the Virgin Mary, Jesus and Saint Sebastian
- Small Church of St. Anthony of Padua (Sesto al Reghena), a Catholic church located in a private property
