= Abbey of Santa Maria in Sylvis =

Coordinates: 45.8483°N 12.8158°E

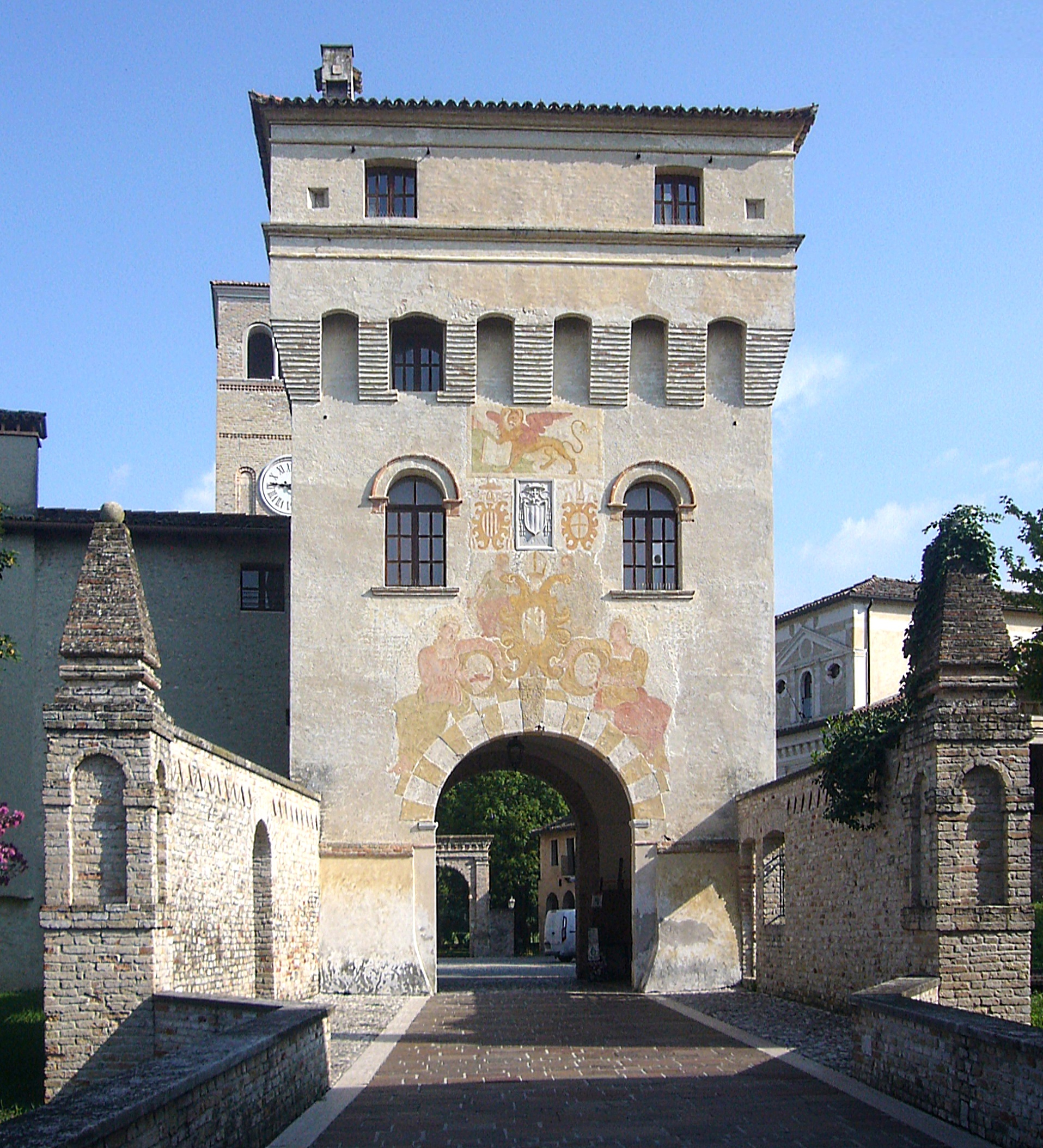
Entrance tower

The Abbey of Santa Maria in Sylvis (Italian: Abbazia di Santa Maria in Silvis) is a monastery in the centre of Sesto al Reghena, in the province of Pordenone, Northeastern Italy.

== History ==
The abbey, founded around 730–735 AD, belonged to the Benedictines until 762. After the fall of the Lombard Kingdom in 774 and the subsequent rebellion of Friuli in 776, the abbey had all its properties confirmed by Charlemagne through a chart including total exemption from any tax obligation to lay authorities.

In 899 it was ravaged by a Magyar raid, and was restored in the 10th century, including the addition of fortifications. In 967 Emperor Otto I donated it to Rodoald, patriarch of Aquileia. In the following years the abbey prospered, commissioning numerous paintings, sculptures and architectural additions to Venetian-Friulian artists. One of its abbot, Godfrey, was elected patriarch of Aquileia in 1182.

From 1441 to 1786, the abbey was a commandry; its first lay abbot was cardinal Pietro Barbo, later Pope Paul II; in the following centuries he was succeeded in general by members of noble families from the Republic of Venice. In 1818 it returned to the Diocese of Concordia and in 1921 it was restored as an abbey.

== Description ==
Although some form of fortification existed from the abbey's very beginnings, a true line of walls was added in the 10th century after the Magyar assault. In 1431 it had up to seven towers, only one of which remains today; this was restored to the current Renaissance appearance by lay abbots Giovanni Michiel and Domenico Grimani (late 15th–early 16th centuries), while in the 18th century a stone bridge replaced the previous drawbridge.

The entrance façade is decorated by a late 15th-century fresco with the Lion of Saint Mark. Below it is a bas-relief with cardinal Grimani's coat of arms, dated to 1521 and repeated on the left. Further below is an allegory of the Good Government under the Grimani family, attributed to Giovanni Battista Grassi.

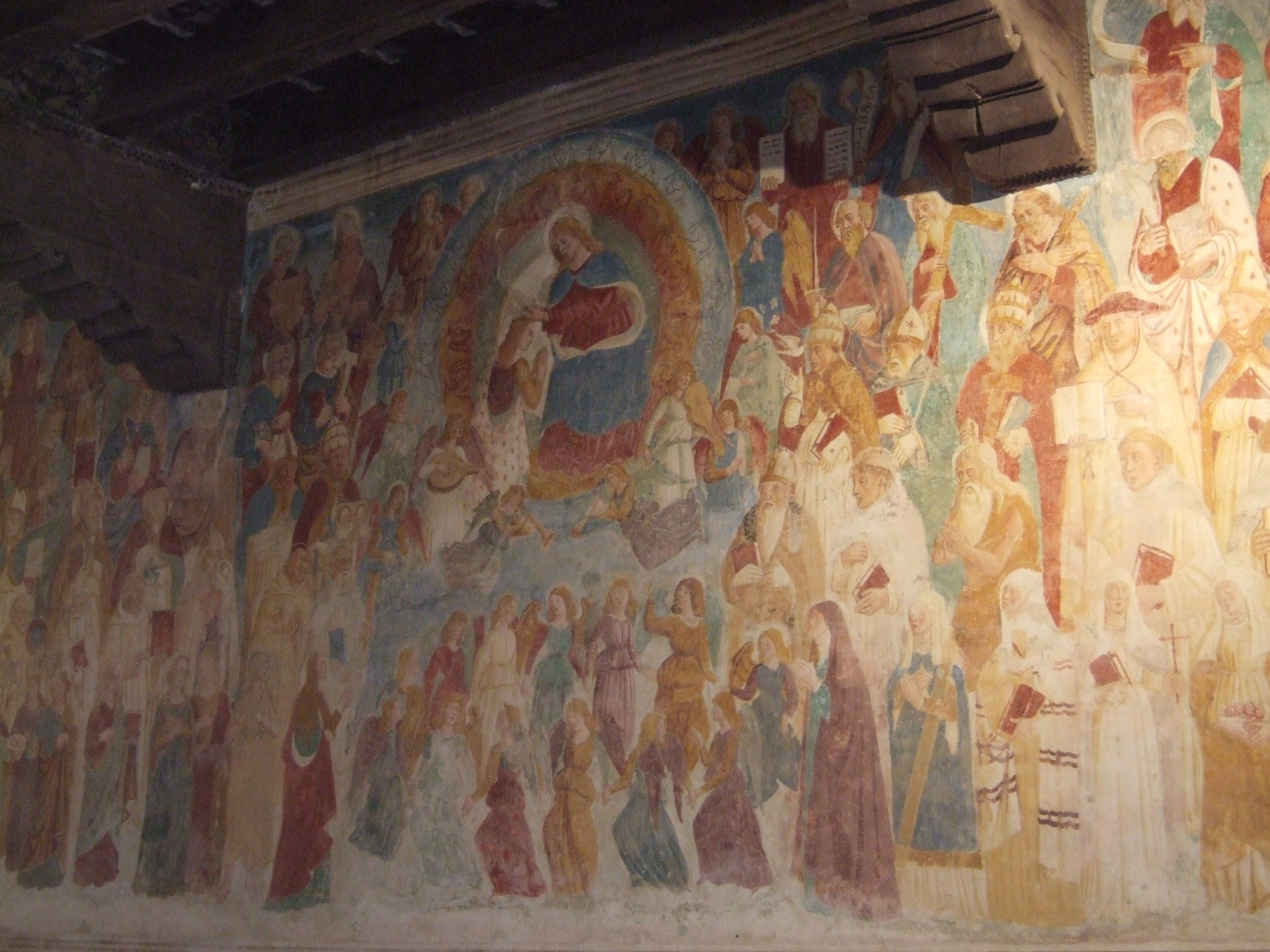
The Paradise fresco in the church's vestibule, including the Coronation of the Virgin

The entrance leads to a central court, faced by the abbey's main buildings. These include the bell tower, standing at 33.6 m (110 ft), built in brickwork in the 11th–12th centuries and decorated by a series of arcades. At the side of the tower is a Renaissance portal with a round arch supported by pillars, dating from the Michiel and Grimani restorations.

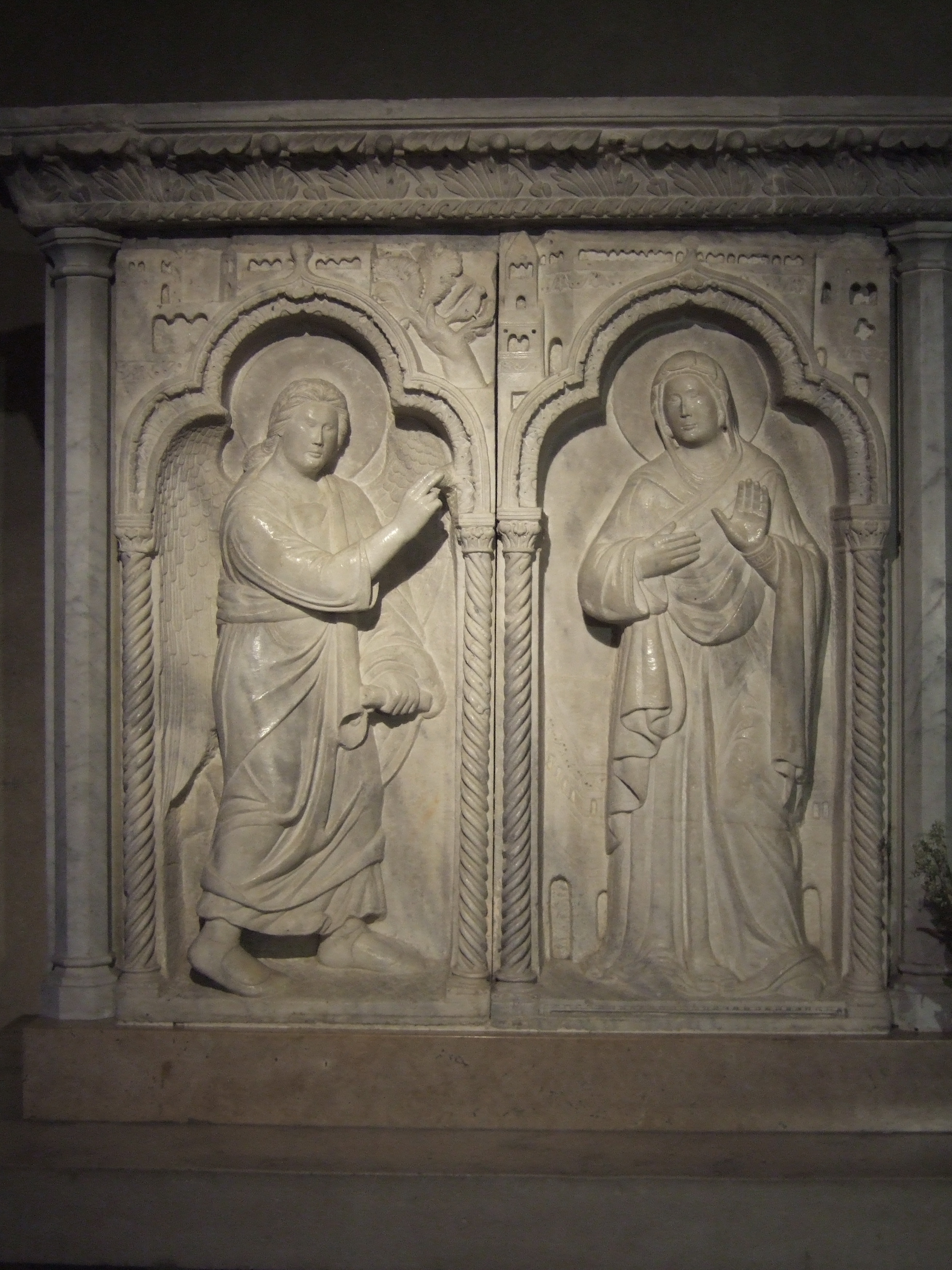
The Annunciation in the crypt

West of the bell tower is the Palazzo della Cancelleria ("Chancellor's Palace"), built in brickwork in the 12th–13th centuries, with a height of 9 m (30 ft). In front of it is the Abbot's Residence, featuring coats of arms of several lay abbots, including Giovanni Alberto Badoer, Carlo Pio di Savoia-Carpi, Girolamo Colonna di Sciarra and Giovanni Cornaro. This edifice is the current town hall of Sesto al Reghena.

The church has a vestibule dating from Pietro Barbo's period, with two fresco cycles of the Paradise (southern wall) and Inferno (northern wall) by Antonio da Firenze and Pellegrino da San Daniele. Under the church is a crypt supported by twenty columns, some of which are ancient spolia. At the center of the crypt is the Urn of St. Anastasia, formed by a single marble block of Greek origin; it was realized by Cividale masters in the 8th century, and has decorations with flowers, crosses, arches, tondoes and rose motifs. The crypt also houses, in two apses, a Pietà of Austrian origin (early 15th century) and an Annunciation sculpted in Slovenian marble showing Byzantine influences, dating from the late 13th–early 14th century.

== Sources ==
- Gian Carlo Menis, Enrica Cozzi, ed. (2001). L'Abbazia di Santa Maria di Sesto: l'arte medievale e moderna. Pordenone: GEAPrint.
