= Girolamo Francesco Cristiani =

Italian engineer and economist (1731–1811)

- Born: 3 August 1731; Brescia
- Died: 30 December 1811 (aged 80); Verona

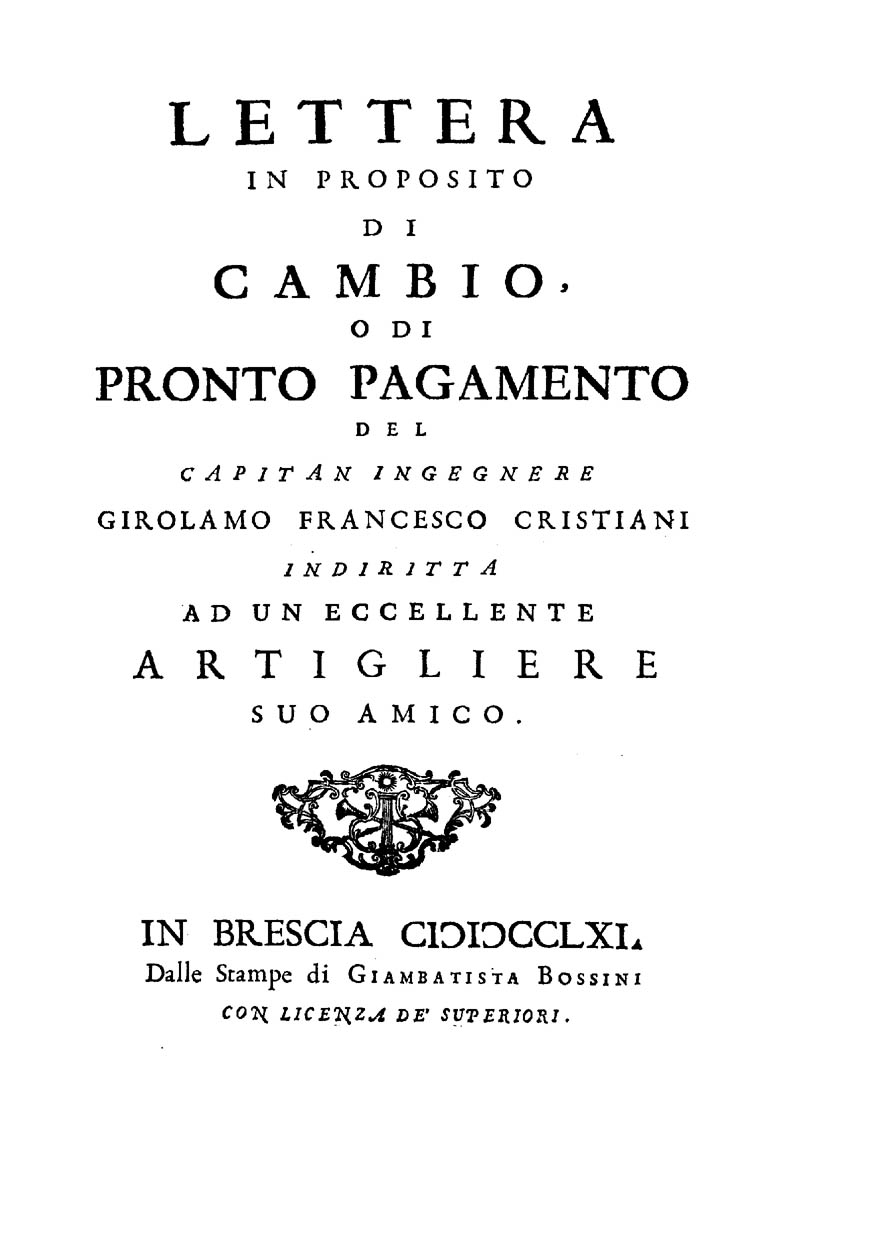
Lettera in proposito di cambio, o di pronto pagamento (1761)

Girolamo Francesco Cristiani (3 August 1731 – 30 December 1811) was an Italian engineer and economist.

He was appreciated by Voltaire and inspired later studies about the Brenta river.

== Works ==
- Delle misure d'ogni genere antiche, e moderne. Brescia: Giambattista Bossini. 1760.
- Lettera in proposito di cambio, o di pronto pagamento. Brescia: Giambattista Bossini. 1761.
- Dissertazione epistolare intorno l'utilita de' modelli nello studio di varie facoltà matematiche, e principalmente dell'architettura militare. Brescia: Giambattista Bossini. 1763.
- Della media armonica proporzionale da applicarsi nell'architettura civile. Brescia: Giambattista Bossini. 1767.
- Allegazione e tre lettere sopra il riflusso, o rigurgito dell'acque correnti. Brescia: Fratelli Pasini. 1773.
- Della inalveazione, e del regolamento del fiume Brenta. Milano: Luigi Veladini. 1795.
