= Andrea Palladio =

Venetian architect (1508–1580)

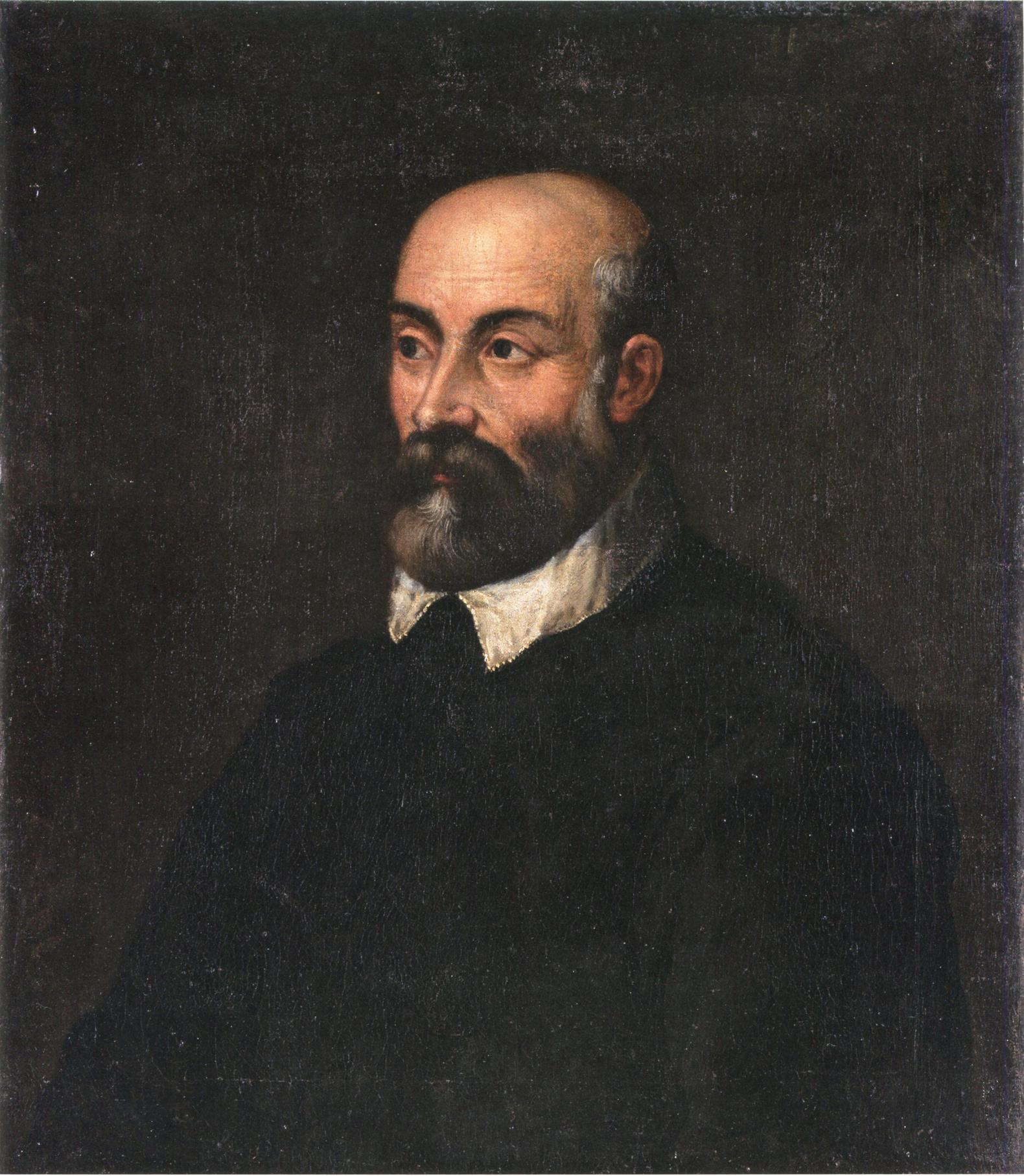
- Portrait of Palladio by Alessandro Maganza
- Born: Andrea di Pietro della Gondola; 30 November 1508; Padua, Republic of Venice
- Died: 19 August 1580 (aged 71); Maser, Republic of Venice
- Occupation: Architect
- Buildings: Villa Barbaro; Villa Capra "La Rotonda"; Basilica Palladiana; Church of San Giorgio Maggiore; Il Redentore; Teatro Olimpico
- Projects: I quattro libri dell'architettura (The Four Books of Architecture)

Andrea Palladio (/pəˈlɑːdioʊ/ pə-LAH-dee-oh; Italian: [anˈdrɛːa palˈlaːdjo]; Venetian: Andrea Paładio; Padova, 30 November 1508 – 19 August 1580) was an Italian Renaissance architect active in the Venetian Republic. Palladio, influenced by Roman and Greek architecture, primarily Vitruvius, is widely considered to be one of the most influential individuals in the history of architecture. While he designed churches and palaces, he was best known for country houses and villas. His teachings, summarized in the architectural treatise, The Four Books of Architecture, gained him wide recognition.

The city of Vicenza, with its 23 buildings designed by Palladio, and his 24 villas in the Veneto are listed by UNESCO as part of a World Heritage Site named City of Vicenza and the Palladian Villas of the Veneto. The churches of Palladio are to be found within the "Venice and its Lagoon" UNESCO World Heritage Site.

== Biography and major works ==
Palladio was born on 30 November 1508 in Padua and was given the name Andrea di Pietro della Gondola (Venetian: Andrea de Piero de ła Gondoła). His father, Pietro, called "della Gondola", was a miller. From an early age, Andrea Palladio was introduced to the work of building. When he was thirteen, his father arranged for him to be an apprentice stonecutter for a period of six years in the workshop of Bartolomeo Cavazza da Sossano, a noted sculptor, whose projects included the altar in the Basilica del Carmine in Padua. Bartolomeo Cavazza is said to have imposed particularly hard working conditions: Palladio fled the workshop in April 1523 and went to Vicenza, but was forced to return to fulfil his contract. In 1524, when his contract was finished, he moved permanently to Vicenza, where he resided for most of his life. He became an assistant to a prominent stonecutter and stonemason, Giovanni di Giacomo da Porlezza in Pedemuro San Biagio, where he joined the guild of stonemasons and bricklayers. He was employed as a stonemason to make monuments and decorative sculptures.

His career was unexceptional until 1538–1539; when he had reached the age of thirty, he was employed by the humanist poet and scholar Gian Giorgio Trissino to rebuild his residence, the Villa Trissino at Cricoli. Trissino was deeply engaged in the study of ancient Roman architecture, particularly the work of Vitruvius, which had become available in print in 1486.

In 1540, Palladio received the formal title of architect. In 1541, he made a first trip to Rome, accompanied by Trissino, to see the classical monuments first-hand. He took another, longer trip to Rome with Trissino from the autumn of 1545 to the first months of 1546, and then another trip in 1546–1547. He also visited and studied the Roman works in Tivoli, Palestrina and Albano.

Trissino exposed Palladio to the history and arts of Rome, which gave him inspiration for his future buildings. In 1554 he would publish guides to the city's ancient monuments and churches. Trissino also gave him the name by which he became known, Palladio, an allusion to the Greek goddess of wisdom Pallas Athene and to a character in a play by Trissino. The word Palladio means Wise one.

=== Early villas ===
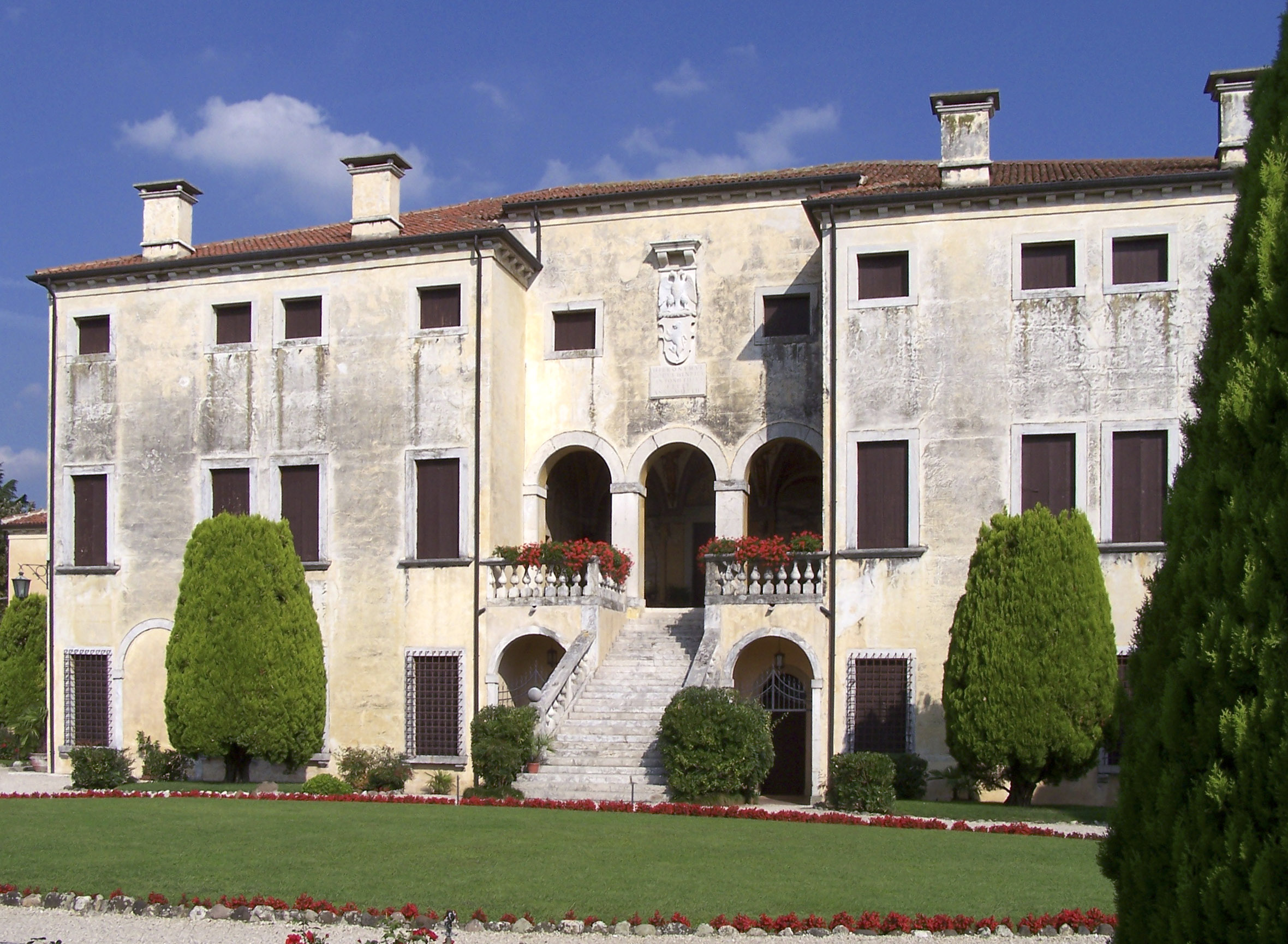
One of the first works by Palladio, Villa Godi (begun 1537)

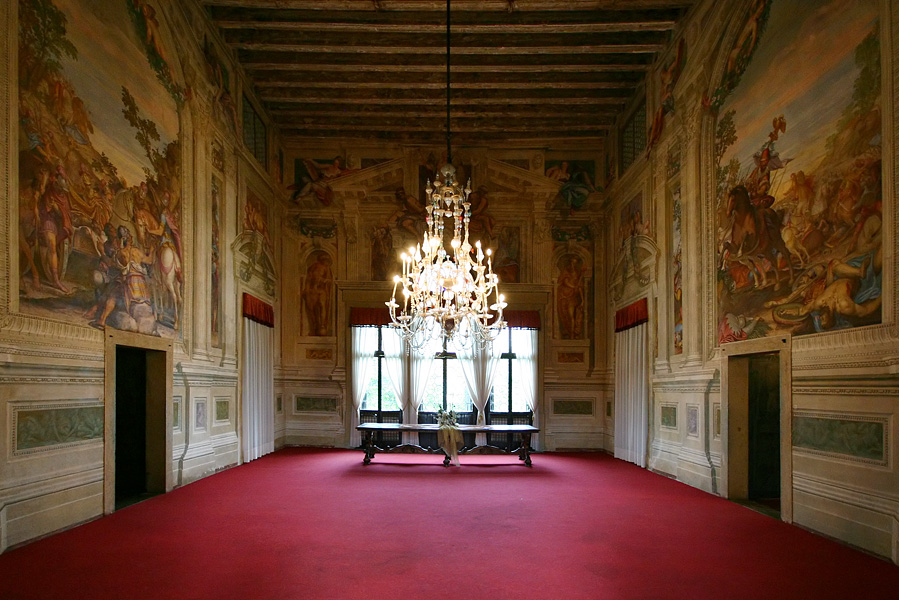
Hall of the Muses of the Villa Godi (1537–1542)

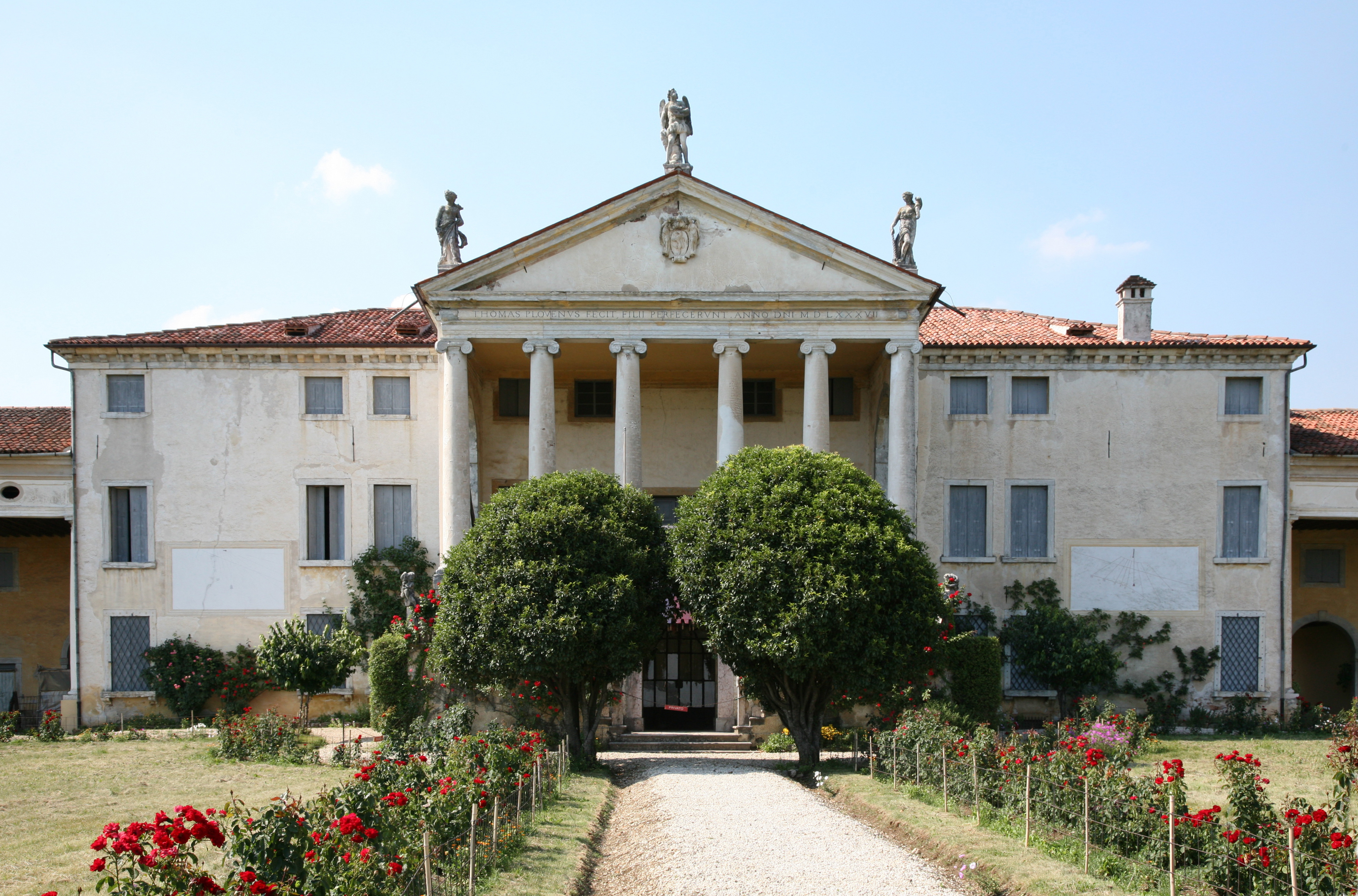
Villa Piovene (1539)

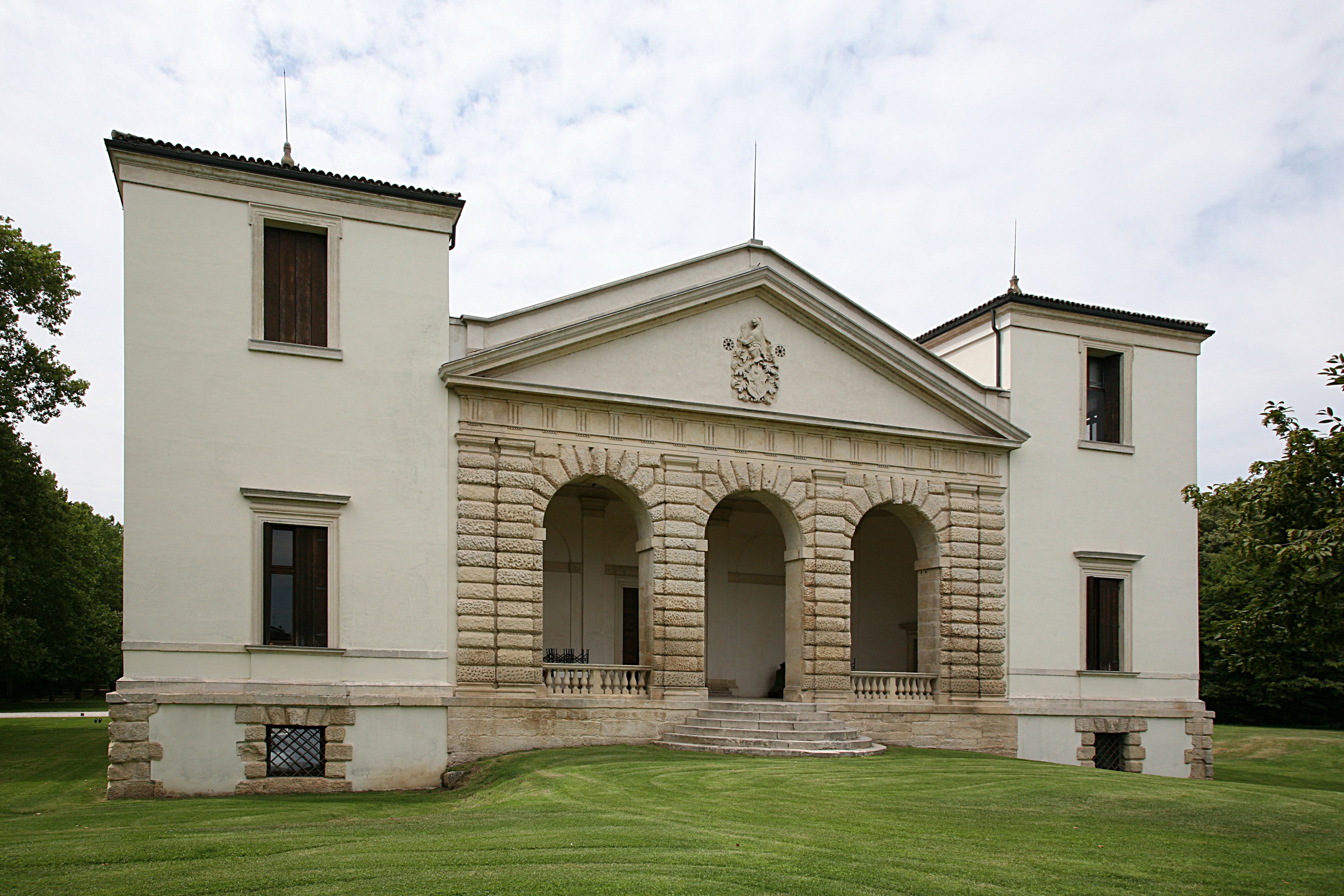
Villa Pisani, Bagnolo (1542)

His earliest work is held to be an addition to Villa Trissino at Cricoli, built before his first trip to Rome.

The earliest of his villas is generally considered to be the Villa Godi (begun 1537). This design already showed the originality of Palladio's conception. A central block is flanked by two wings; the central block is recessed and the two wings are advanced and more prominent. Inside the central block, the piano nobile or main floor opened onto a loggia with a triple arcade, reached by a central stairway. On the reverse of the building, the rounded gallery projects outward to the garden. Palladio made numerous changes and additions over the years, adding lavish frescoes framed by classical columns in the Hall of the Muses of the Villa Godi in the 1550s.

In his early works in Vicenza in the 1540s, he sometimes emulated the work of his predecessor Giulio Romano, but in doing so he added his own ideas and variations. An example was the Palazzo Thiene in Vicenza, which Romano had begun but which, after Romano's death, Palladio completed. It was his first construction of a large townhouse. He used Romano's idea for windows by stone corbeaux, a ladder of stone blocks, but Palladio gave the heavy facade a new lightness and grace.

Several other villas of this time are attributed to Palladio, including the Villa Piovene (1539) and Villa Pisani (1542). Of the Villa Pisani, only the central structure of the original plan remains. The loggia is opened by three arcades beneath a frieze, beneath a pediment. The interior of the main hall has a barrel-vaulted ceiling lavishly decorated with murals of mythological themes.

=== Urban palaces ===
One of the most important works of his early Vicenza period is the Basilica Palladiana in Vicenza (1546), the palace of the city government. Palladio called it "Basilica", explaining that the functions and form of a modern city hall resembled those of an ancient Roman Basilica. He did not construct the building from the ground up, but added two-story loggias to the exterior of an older building, which had been finished in 1459. For the facade, Palladio made use of two levels of arcades with rounded arches and columns, which opened the exterior of the building to the interior courtyard. The arcades were divided by columns and small circular windows (oculi), with a variety and richness of decorative detail. The building was not completed until 1617, after Palladio's death. Its design had a notable influence on many buildings across Europe, from Portugal to Germany.

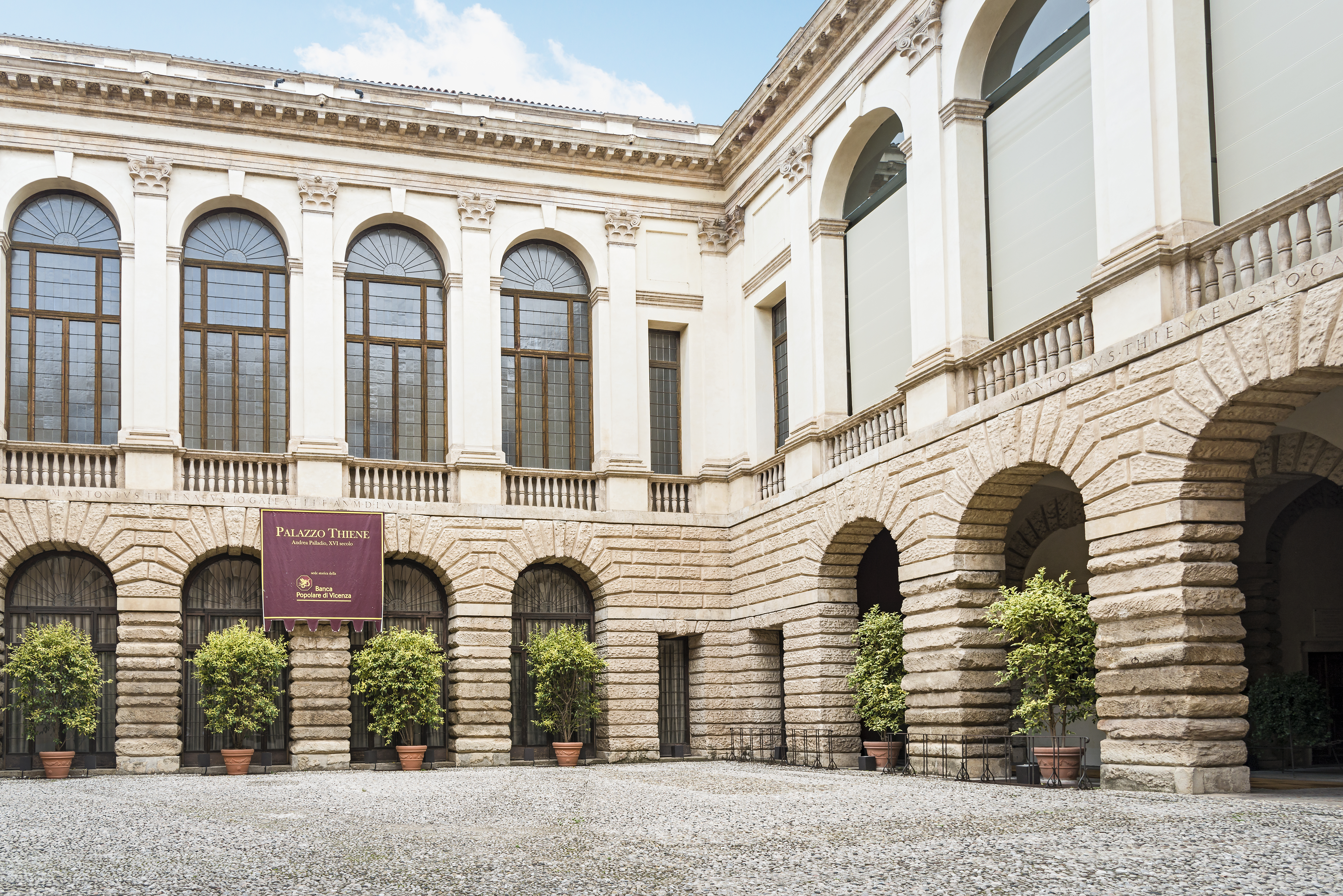
Palazzo Thiene (1542–1558), (begun by Giulio Romano, revised and completed by Palladio)

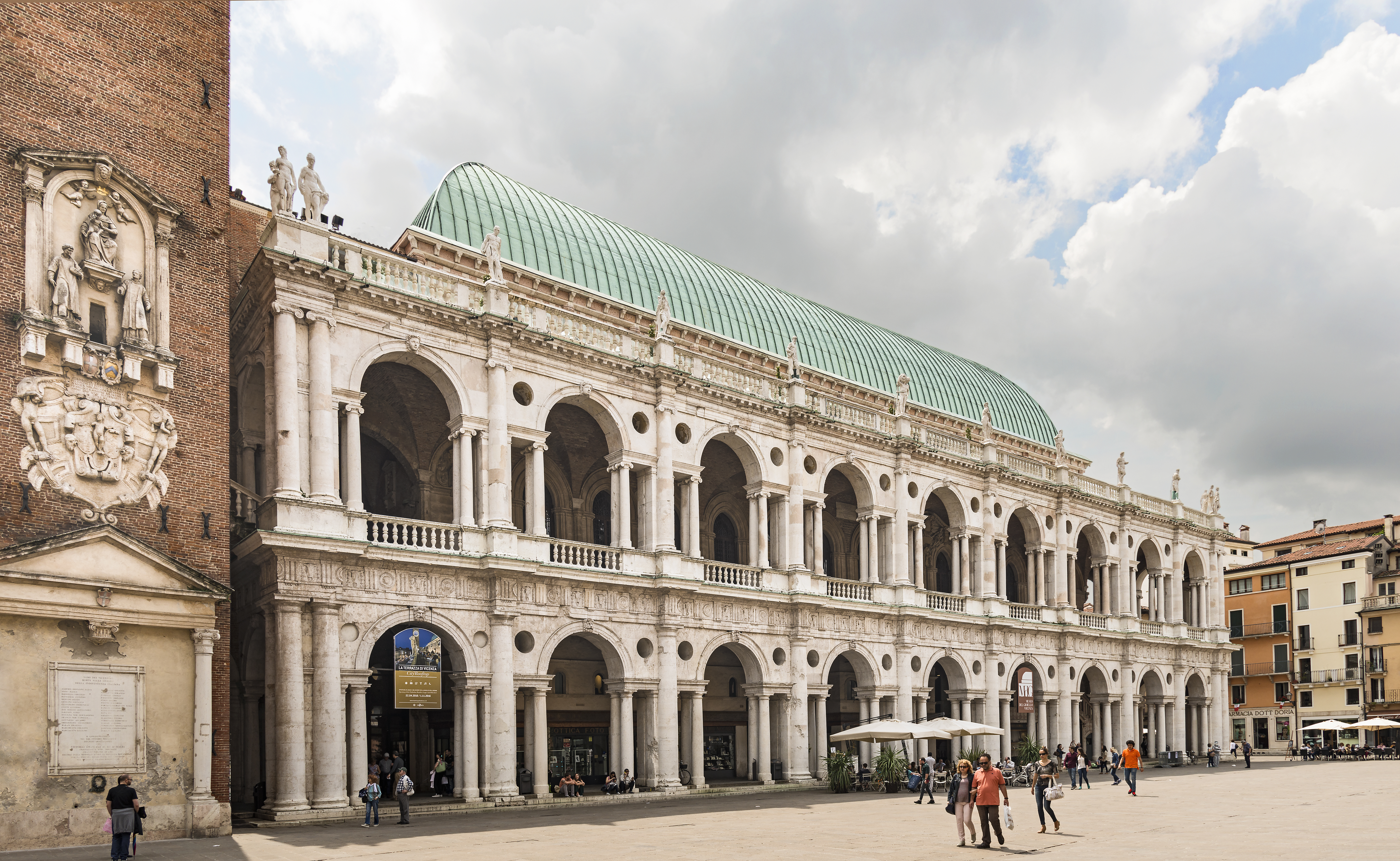
Facade of the Basilica Palladiana (begun 1546)

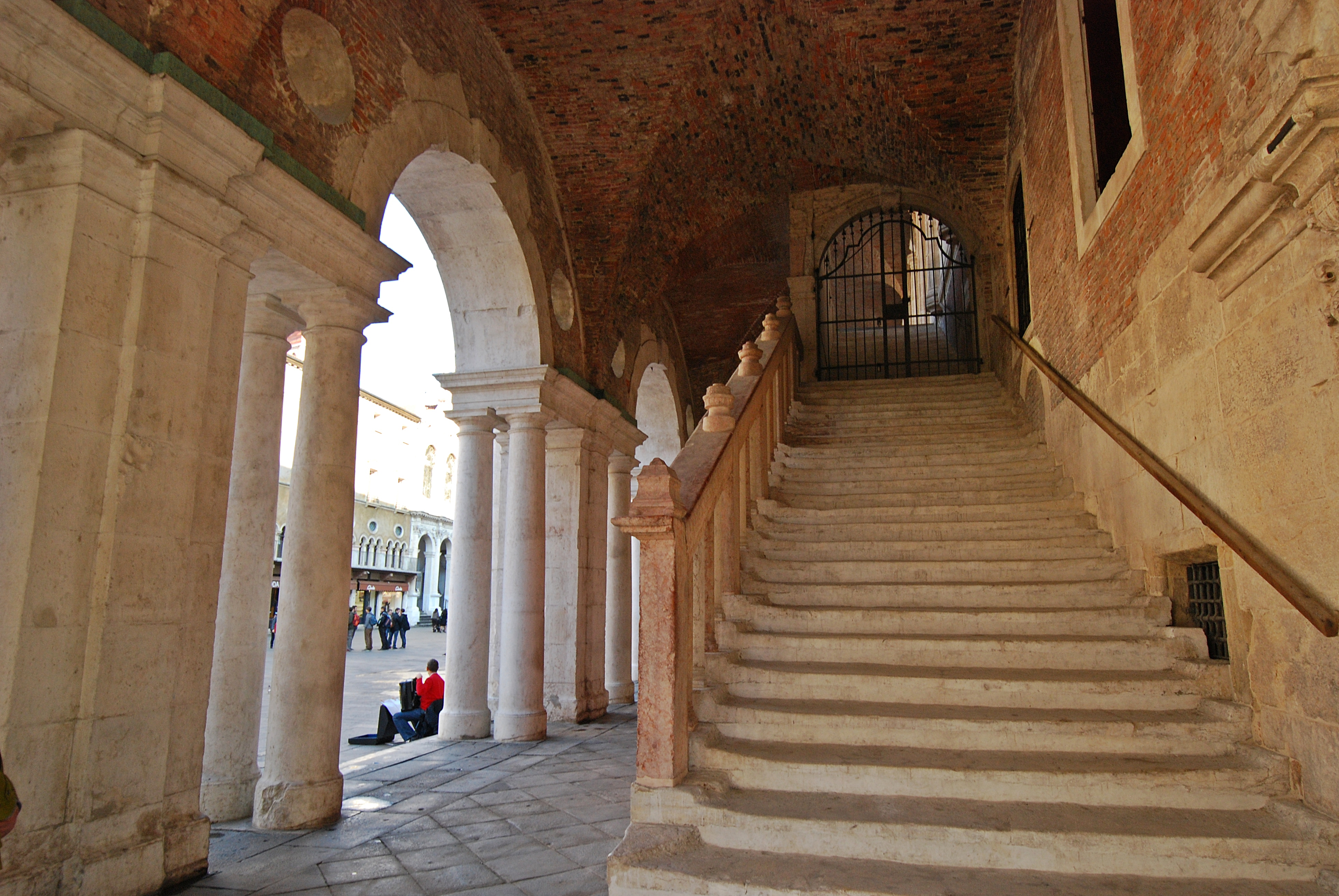
Ground floor and entrance stairway of the Basilica Palladiana

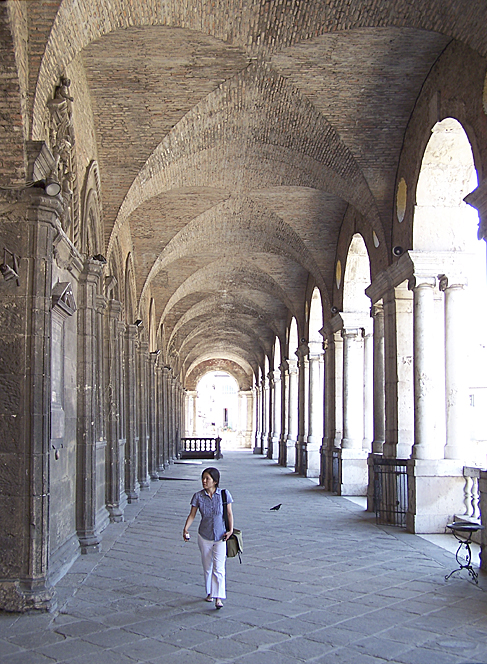
Upper level loggia of the Basilica Palladiana

=== Variations of the urban palace ===
Palazzo Chiericati (begun in 1550) was another urban palace, built on a city square near the port in Vicenza. It was constructed after the Palazzo della Ragione, but it was very different in its plan and decoration. The two-story facade with a double loggia was divided into eleven spaces by rows of Doric columns, while a Doric cornice separated the lower level from the more important piano nobile above. The original plan of Palladio had the upper level identical to the lower level, but the owners wanted more space for ceremonies, so the central section on the piano nobile was brought forward and given windows with decorative frontons, doubling the interior space.

The Palazzo del Capitaniato, the offices of the Venetian governor of the region, is a later variation on the urban palace, built in Vicenza facing the Basilica Palladiana, and the finest of his late urban palaces. The four brick half-columns on the facade give a strong element of verticality, carefully balanced by the horizontal balustrades on the piano nobile, and on the projecting cornice at the top. The red brick of the walls and columns and the white stone of the balustrades and bases of the columns give another contrast. The facade was later given stucco sculptural decoration in the Mannerist style, which has considerably deteriorated.

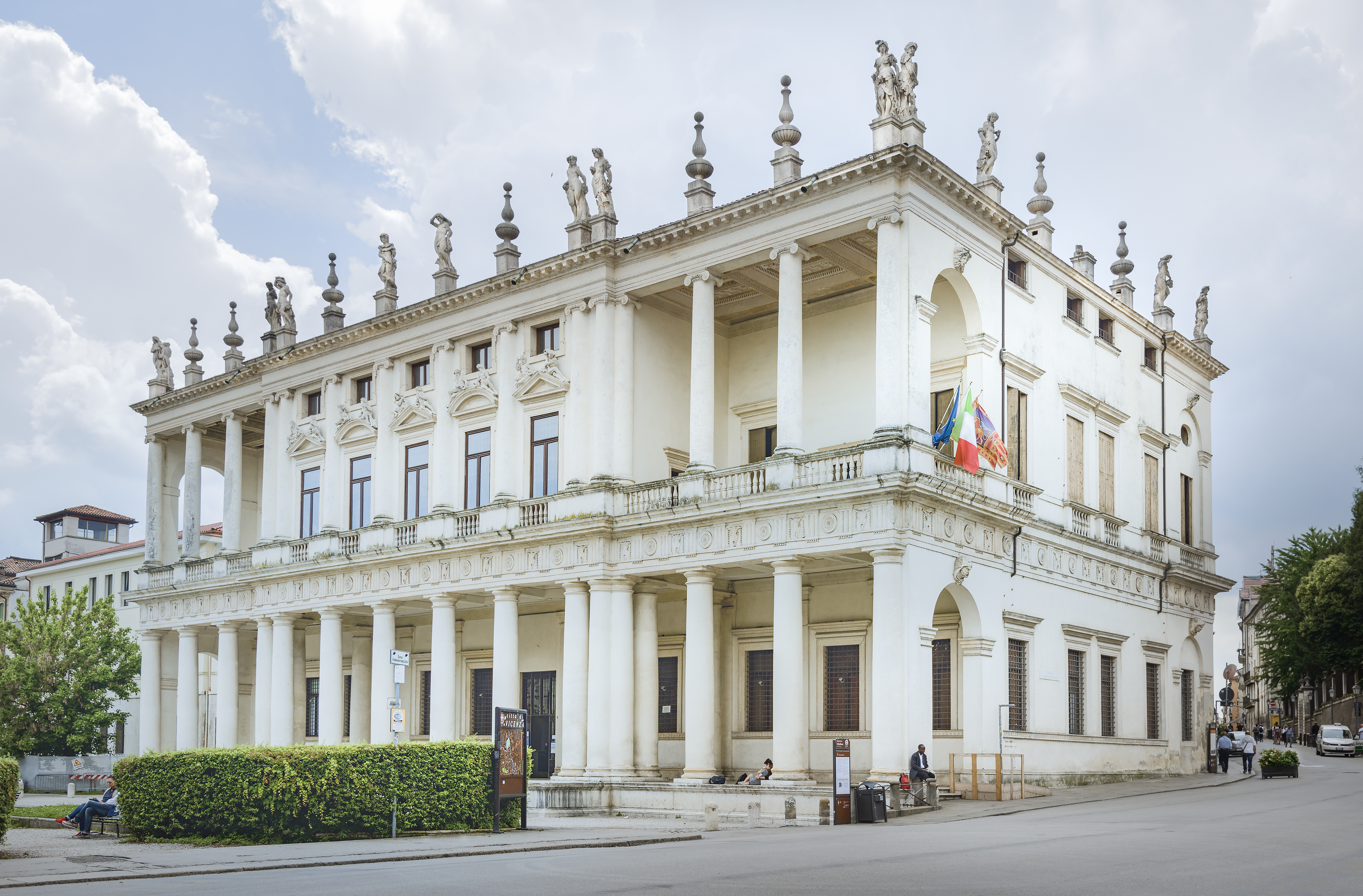
Palazzo Chiericati (1550) in Vicenza

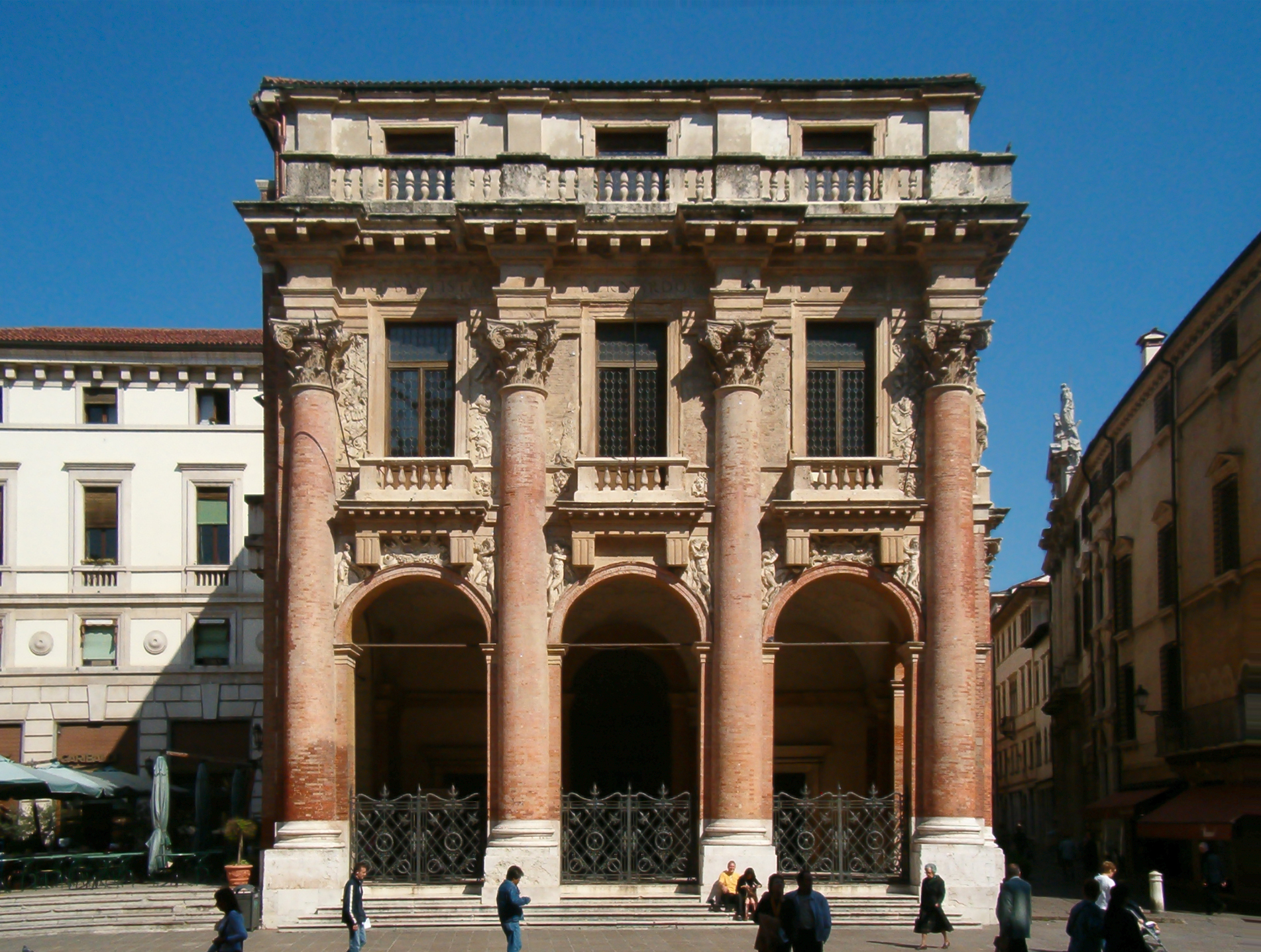
Palazzo del Capitaniato (1565–1572)

=== Classical studies ===
The success of the Basilica Palladiana propelled Palladio into the top ranks of the architects of Northern Italy. He had travelled to Rome in 1549, hoping to become a Papal architect, but the death of Pope Paul III ended that ambition. His patron, Gian Giorgio Trissino, died in 1550, but in the same year Palladio gained a new supporter, the powerful Venetian aristocrat Daniele Barbaro. Through Barbaro he became known to the major aristocratic families of Northern Italy. In addition to the Barbaros, the aristocratic Cornaro, Foscari, and Pisani families supported Palladio's career, while he continued to construct a series of magnificent villas and palaces in Vicenza in his new classical style, including the Palazzo Chiericati in Vicenza, the Villa Pisani in Montagnana, and the Villa Cornaro in Piombino Dese.

Cardinal Barbaro brought Palladio to Rome and encouraged him to publish his studies of classical architecture. In 1554, he published the first of a series of books, Antiquities of Rome. He continued to compile and write his architectural studies, lavishly illustrated, which were published in full form in 1570 as I quattro libri dell'architettura (The Four Books of Architecture), in Venice. These books, reprinted in different languages and circulated widely in Europe, secured his reputation as the most influential figure in the renewal of classical architecture, a reputation which only continued to grow after his death.

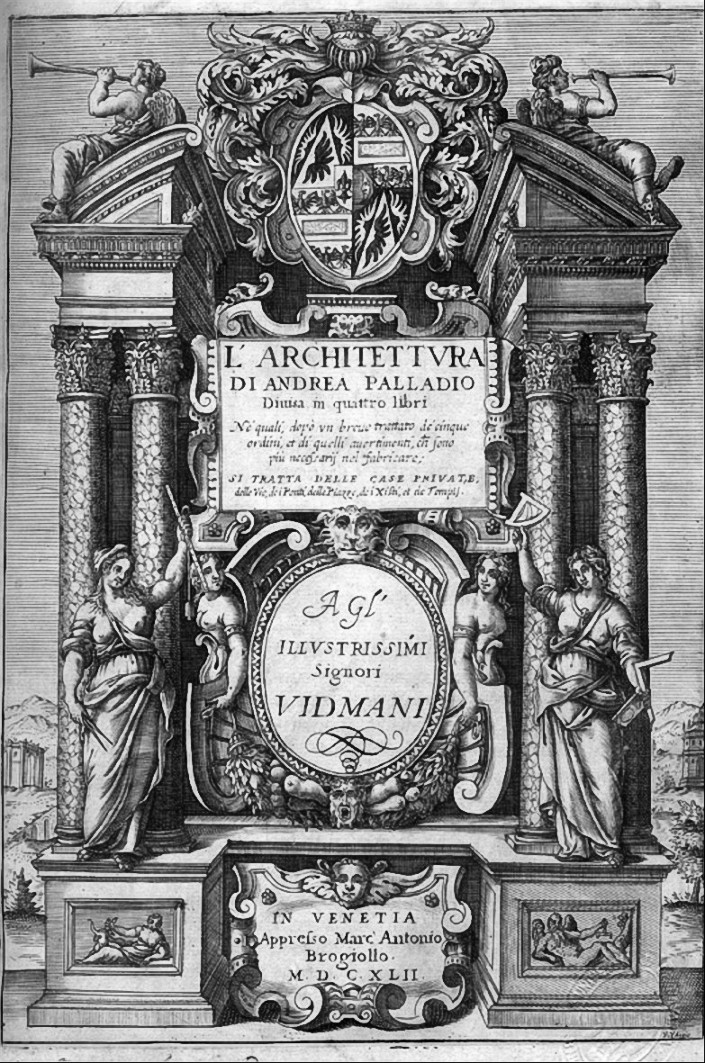
The front page of I quattro libri dell'architettura (The Four Books of Architecture) (1642 edition)

=== Rustic-suburban villas ===
The type of villa invented by Palladio at the Villa Cornaro (begun 1553), located at Piombino Dese near Padua, was a mixture of villa rustica (country house), designed for country living, and a suburban villa, designed for entertaining and impressing. The distinction between the two parts was clearly expressed in the architecture. The central block is nearly square, with two low wings. The rear facade facing the garden has a spacious loggia, or covered terrace, supported by independent columns, on both the ground level and above on the piano nobile. The front facade facing the road has the same plan but with narrower loggias. The Hall of the Four Columns, the grand salon, could be entered by a grand stairway from either the front or back of the house. It has a very high ceiling, creating a large cubic space, and a roof supported by four Doric columns. Palladio placed niches in the walls of this salon, which were later filled with full-length statues of the ancestors of the owner. The more rustic functions of the house were carried on in the adjoining wings.

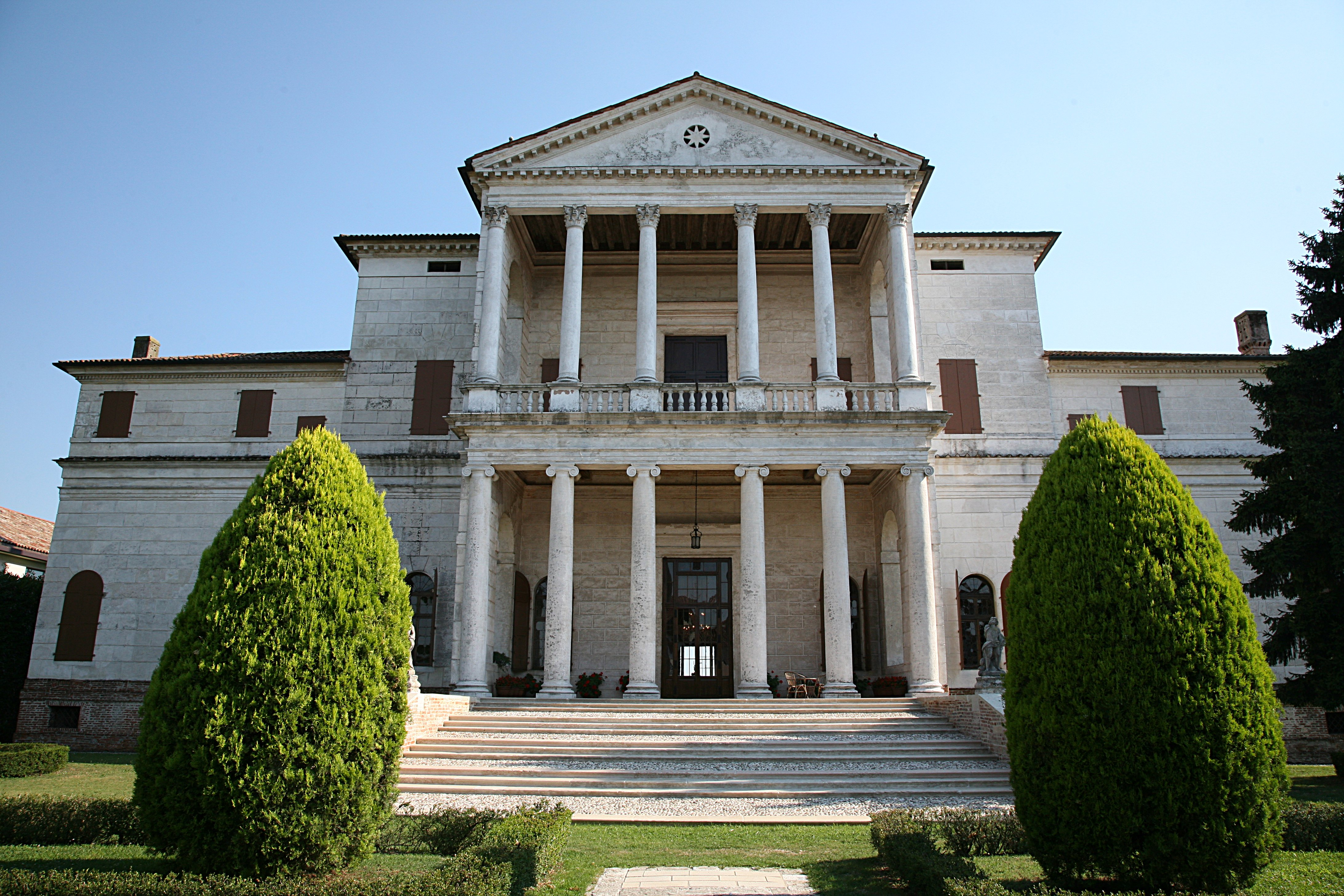
Villa Cornaro (begun 1553) combined rustic living and an imposing space for formal entertaining

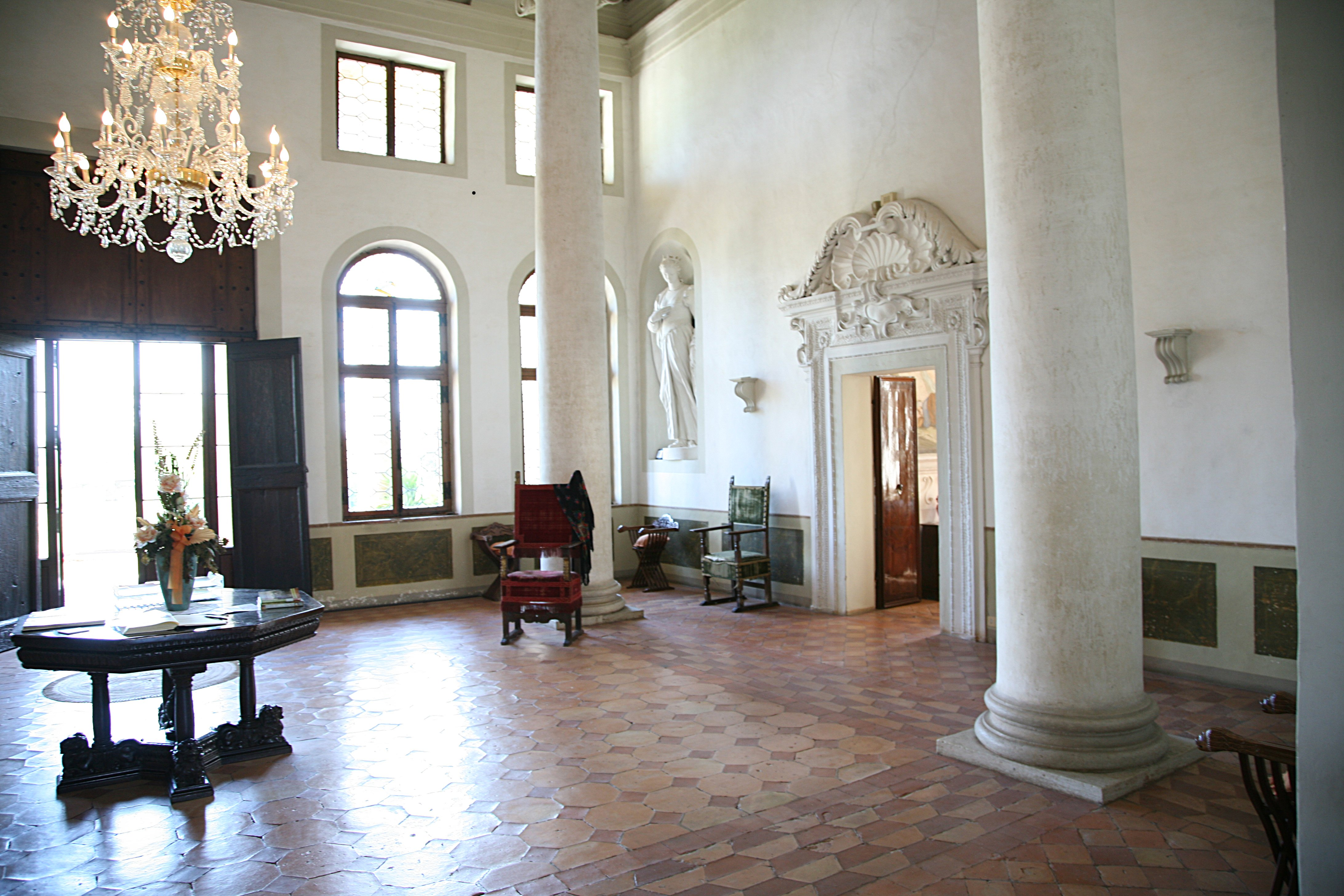
The Hall of the Four Columns

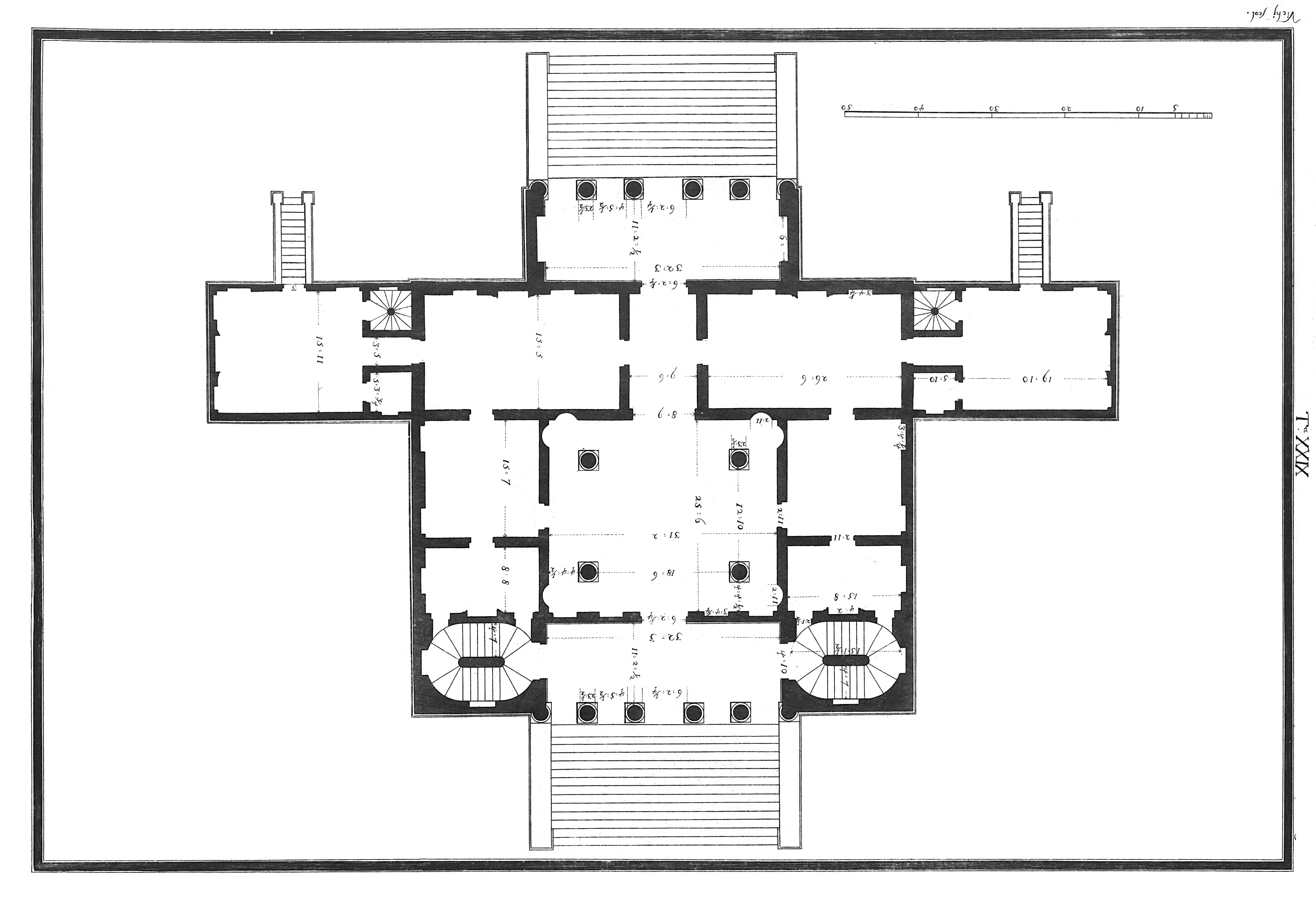
Plan of the Villa Cornaro

=== Suburban villas ===
The suburban villa was a particular type of building, a house near a city designed primarily for entertaining. Villa Barbaro (begun 1557) at Maser was an imposing suburban villa, built for the brothers Marcantonio and Daniele Barbaro, who were respectively occupied with politics and religious affairs in the Veneto, or Venice region. The long facade was perfectly balanced. The interior, following the professions of the brothers, had both classical and religious motifs. The central hall, The Hall of Olympus on the ground floor, was decorated with Roman gods and goddesses, but when one mounted the stairs, the long upper floor was in the form of a cross and Christian images predominate. The villa also has a series of remarkable frescos and ceiling paintings by Paolo Veronese combining mythical themes with scenes of everyday life. Behind the villa, Palladio created a remarkable nymphaeum, or Roman fountain, with statues of the gods and goddesses of the major rivers of Italy.

The most famous suburban villa constructed by Palladio was the Villa Capra "La Rotonda", not far from Vicenza, begun in 1566 for Count Paolo Almerico, the canon of Pope Pius IV and Pope Pius V. The site is on a gentle wooded hilltop, with views of the countryside in all directions. The villa is perfectly symmetrical, with four identical facades with porticos around the domed centre. The height of the base is exactly the height of the attic, and the width of each portico is exactly half the length of the facade. The interior frescos were painted by Ludovico Dorigny in 1680–1687, and were not part of Palladio's plan. The building was especially influential, particularly in England and the United States, where it inspired "Neo-Palladianist" buildings such as Mereworth Castle (1724) in Kent and Thomas Jefferson's Monticello in Virginia (1772).

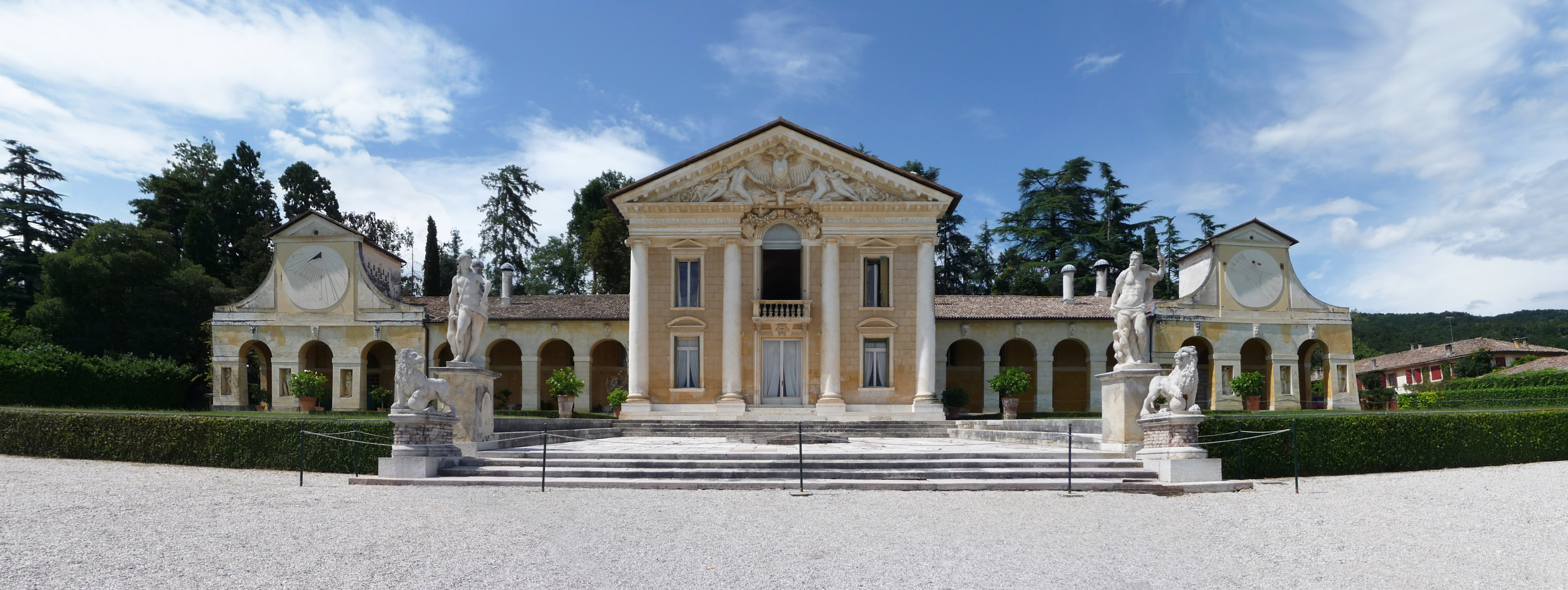
The Villa Barbaro in Maser (begun 1557)

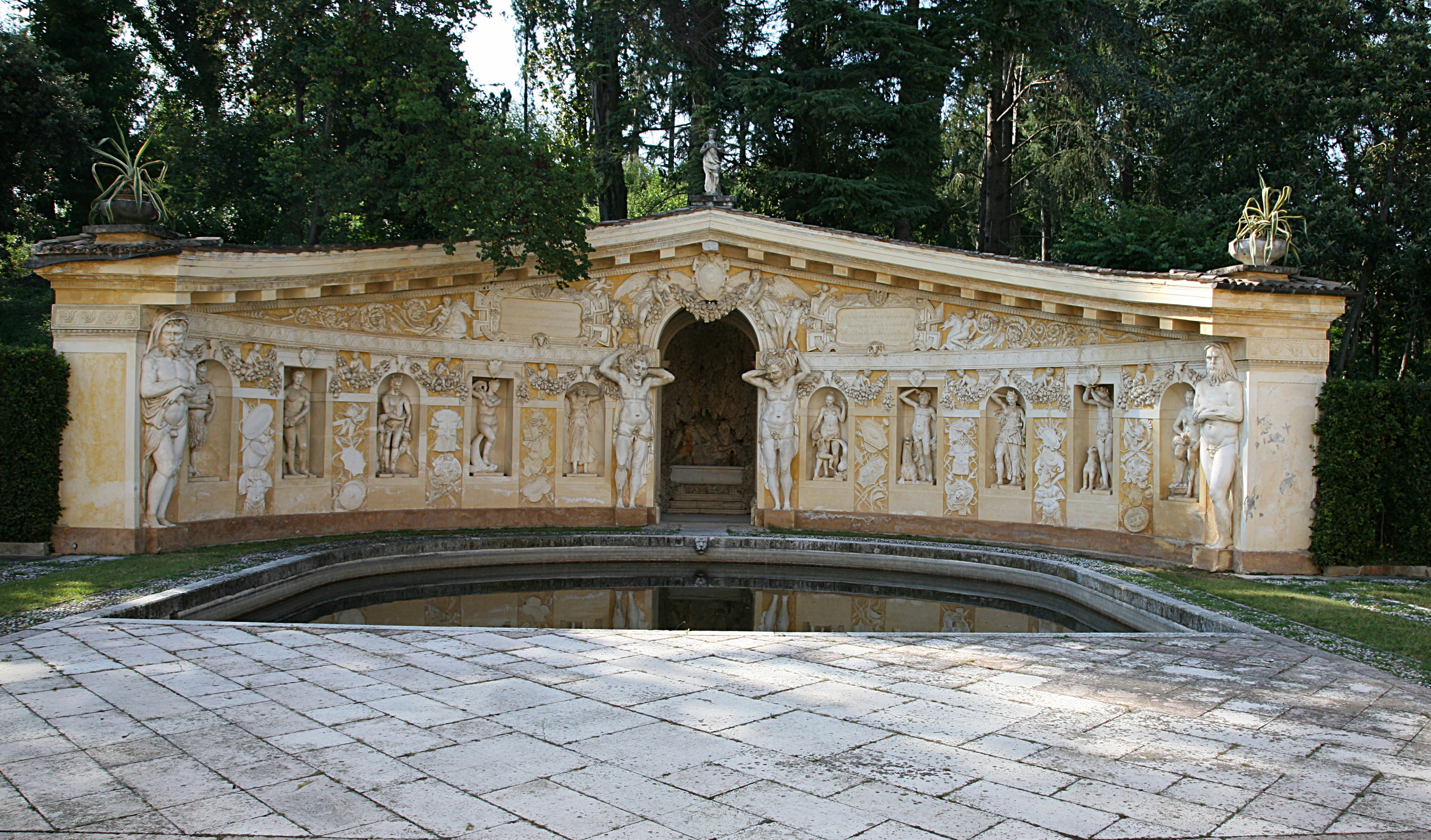
The Nymphaeum of the Villa Barbaro

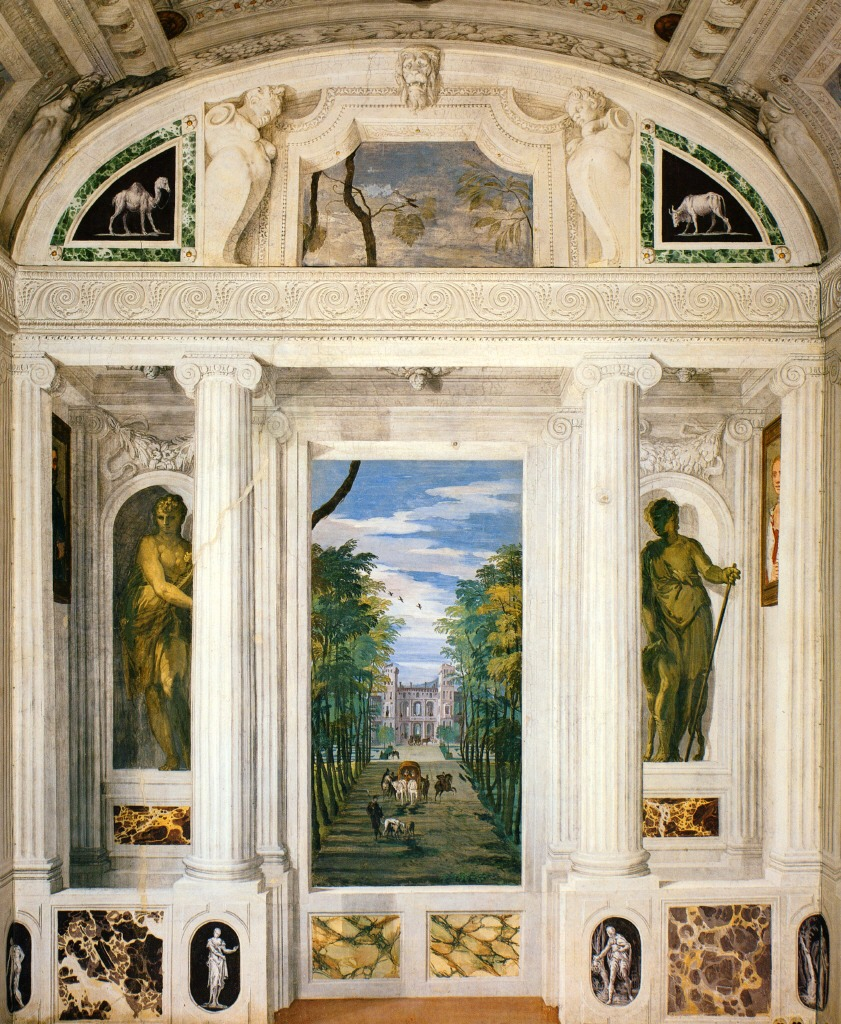
Detail of the Hall of Olympus, with frescoes by Paolo Veronese

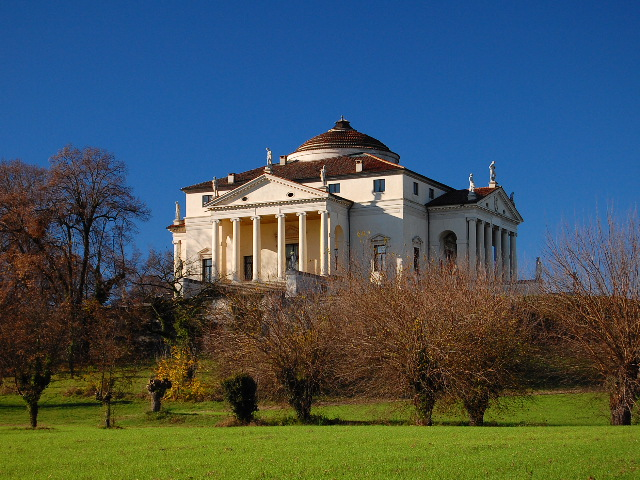
Villa Capra "La Rotonda" (begun 1566)

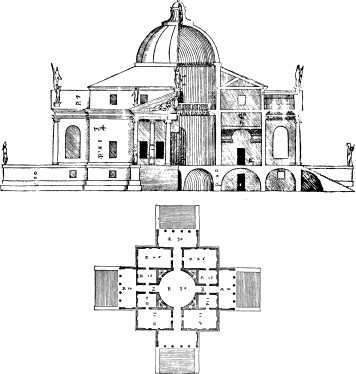
Palladio's plan of the Villa in I quattro libri dell'architettura, 1570

Villa Foscari, also known as "La Malcontenta" for the name of the suburban village near Venice where it is located, faces the Brenta Canal and for this reason, unlike his other villas, it faces south to the canal. The villa is set upon a large base, and the central portico is flanked by two stairways. The upper and lower borders of the piano nobile are clearly indicated on the facade by darker reddish bands of stone. The same reddish border outlines the pediment over the portico and the attic, and appears on the rear facade. In another departure from traditional villas, the front doors lead directly into the main salon. The salon is let by a virtual wall of glass around the doorway of the south facade. The exterior and interior are closely integrated; the same classical elements own the facade, the columns and pediments, reappear in the interior, decorated with trompe-l'œil murals on the walls and ceiling.

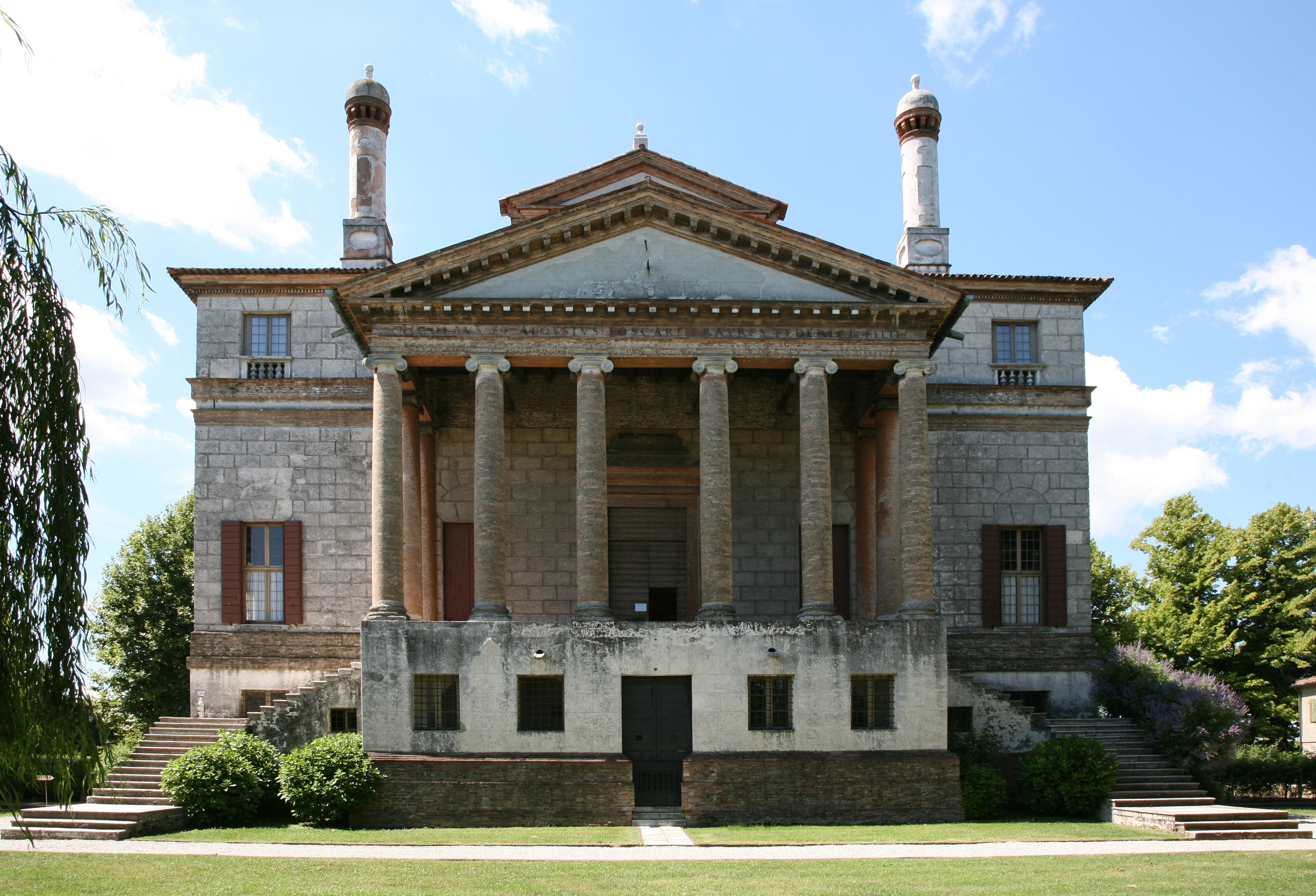
North facade of Villa Foscari, facing the Brenta Canal

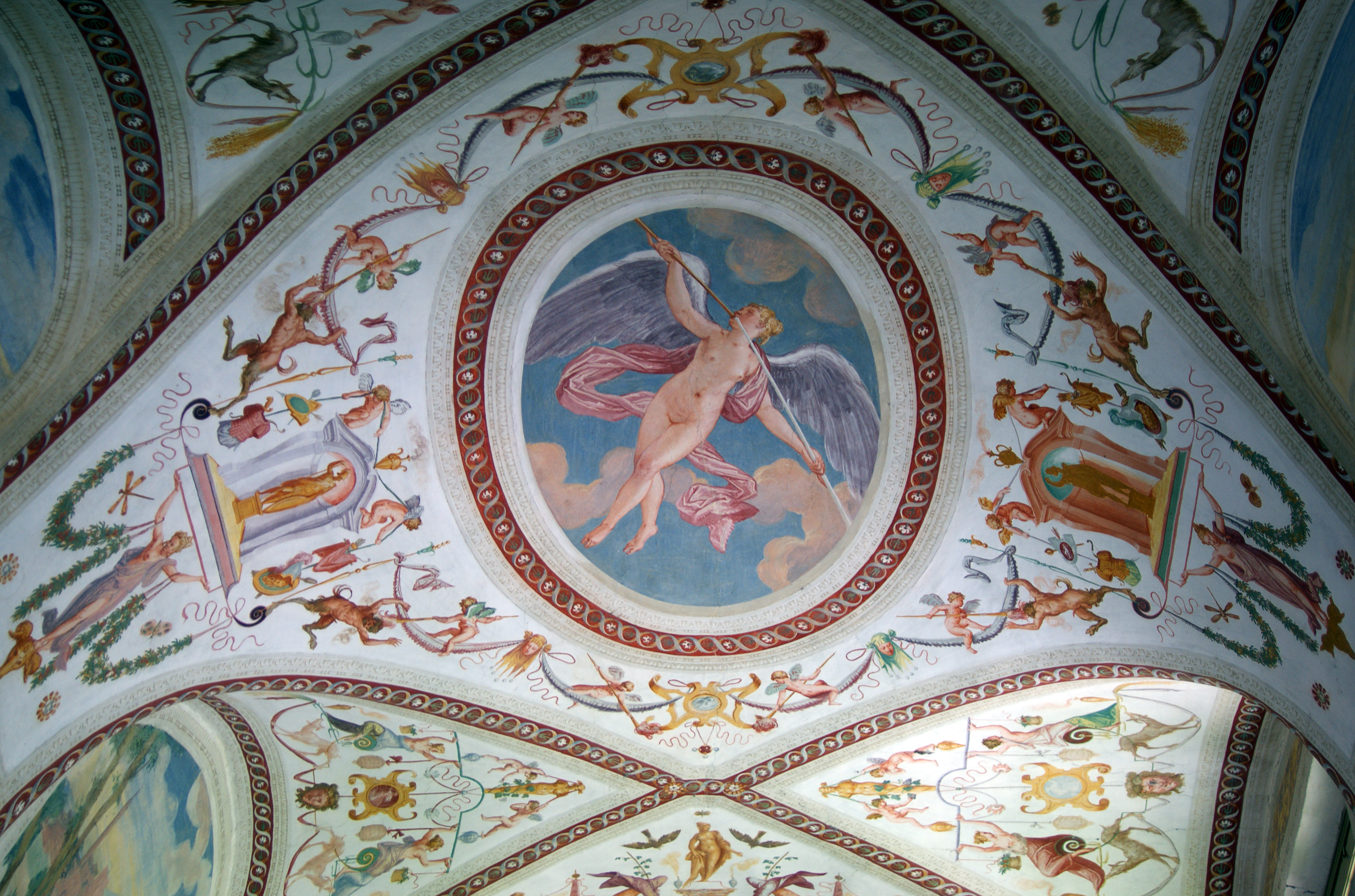
Interior decoration of grotesques on salon ceiling of Villa Foscari

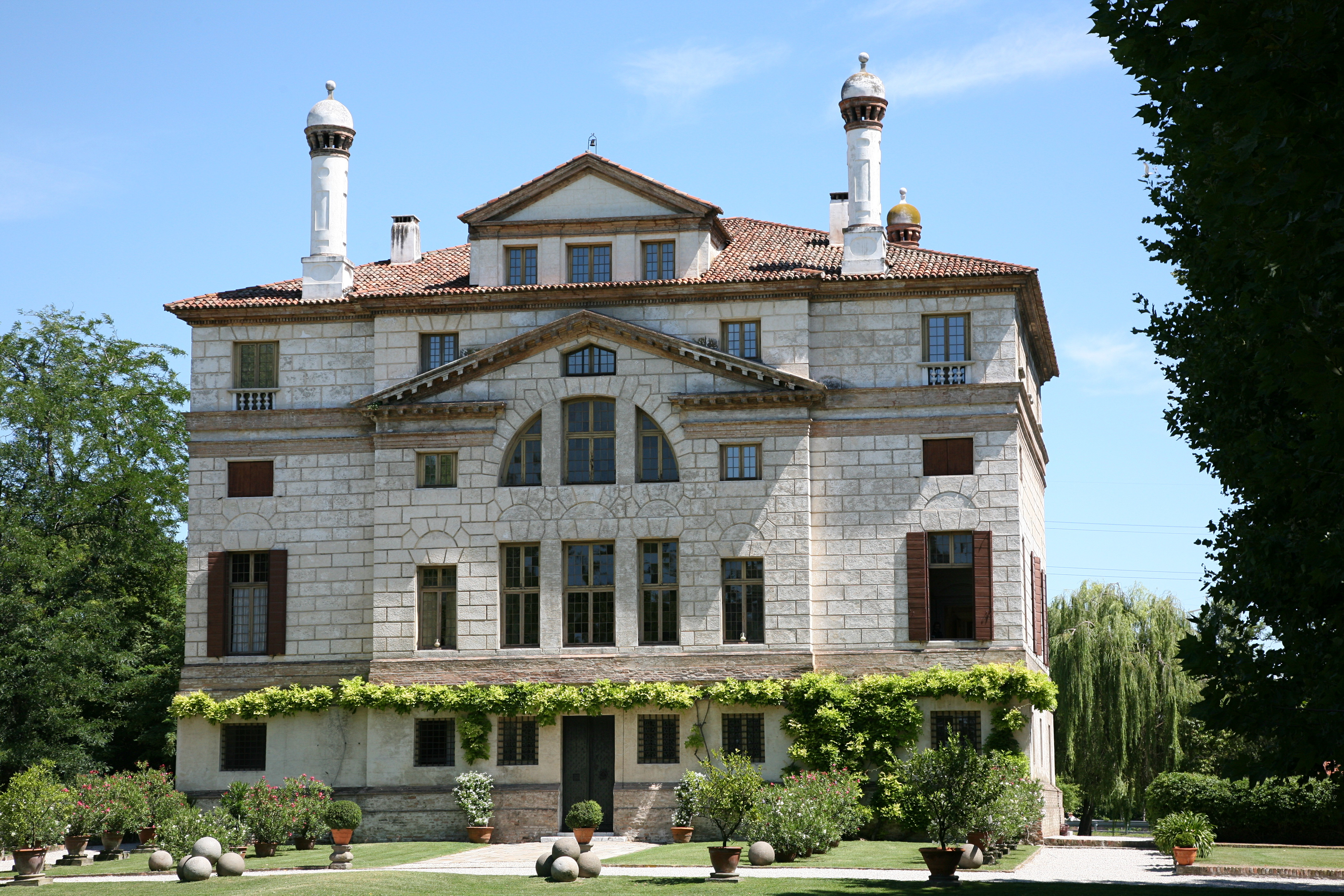
South facade of Villa Foscari, with the large windows that illuminate the main salon

=== Churches ===
Daniele Barbaro and his younger brother Marcantonio introduced Palladio to Venice, where he developed his own style of religious architecture, distinct from and equally original as that of his villas. His first project in Venice was the cloister of the church of Santa Maria della Carità (1560–1561), followed by the refectory and then the interior of the San Giorgio Monastery (1560–1562). His style was rather severe compared with the traditional lavishness of Venetian Renaissance architecture. San Georgio Maggiore was later given a new facade by Vincenzo Scamozzi (1610), which integrated it more closely into the Venetian skyline. The original rigorous, perfectly balanced interior is the original work of Palladio.

In 1570, he was formally named "Proto della Serenissima" (chief architect of the Republic of Venice), following Jacopo Sansovino.

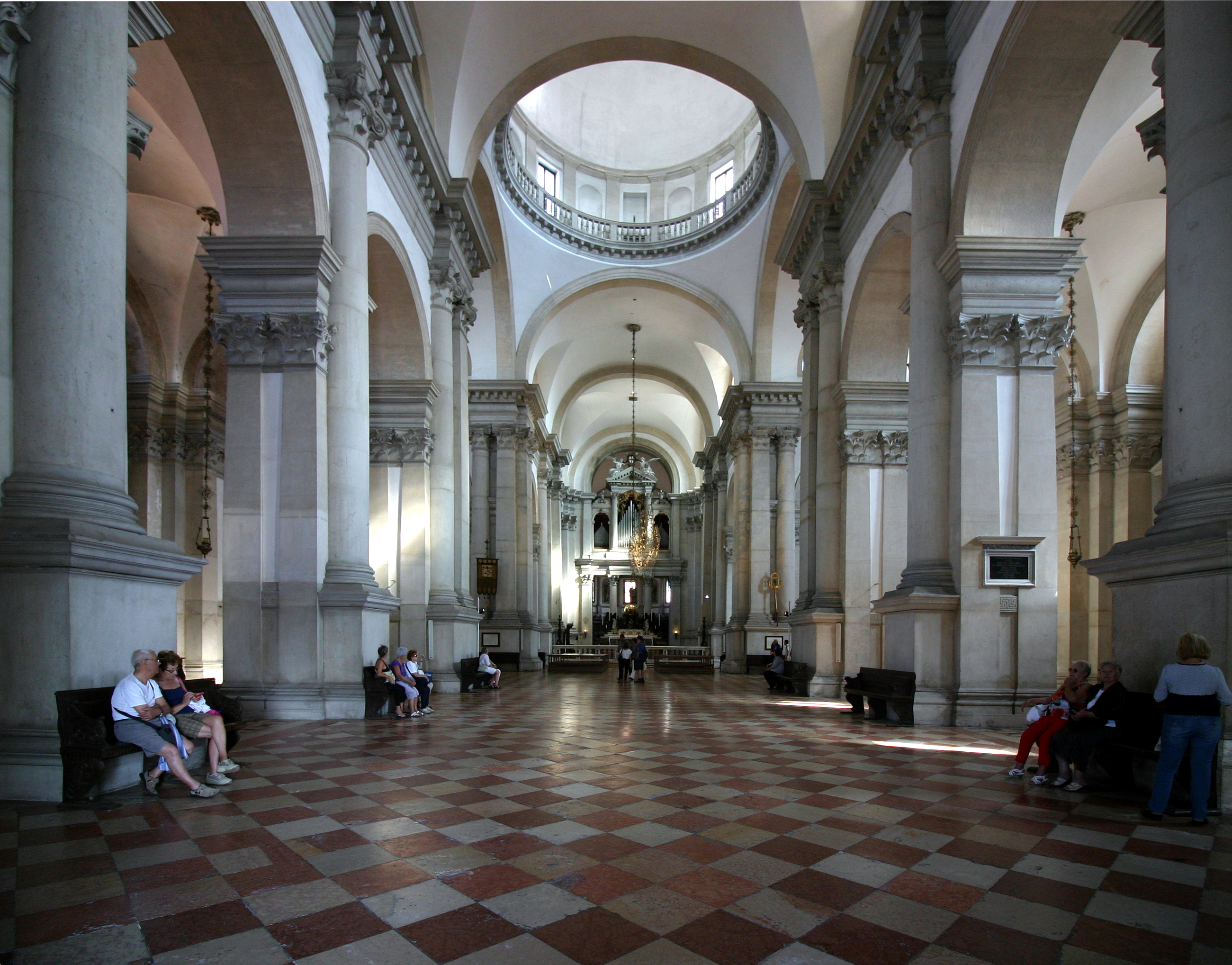
Nave of San Giorgio Maggiore, Venice (1565)

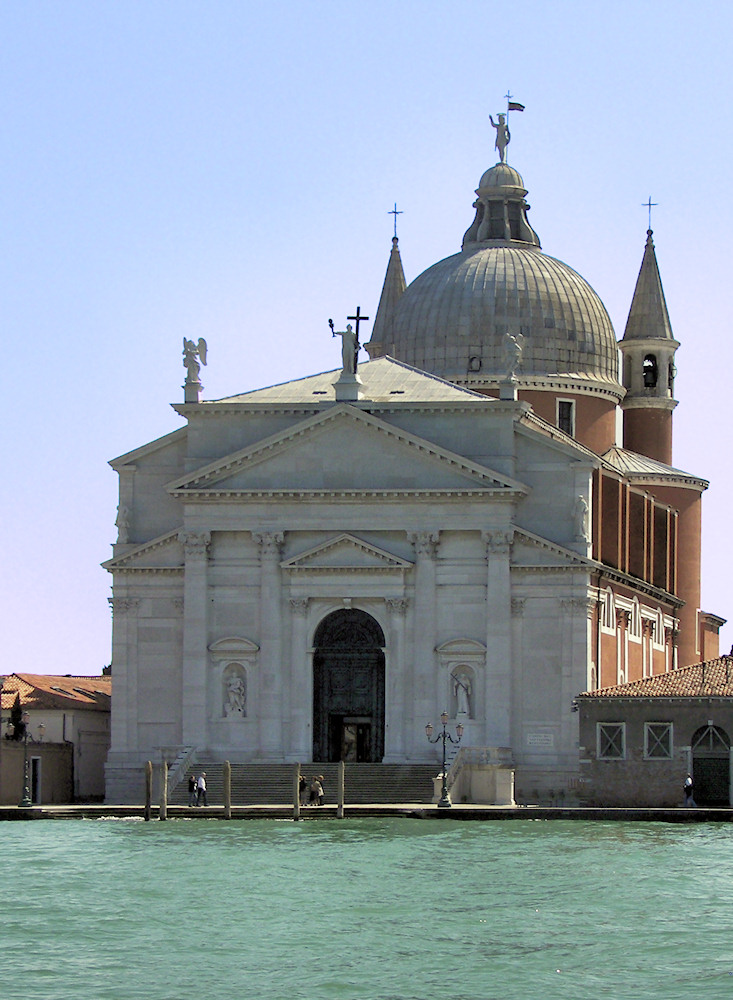
Il Redentore Church in Venice (1576)

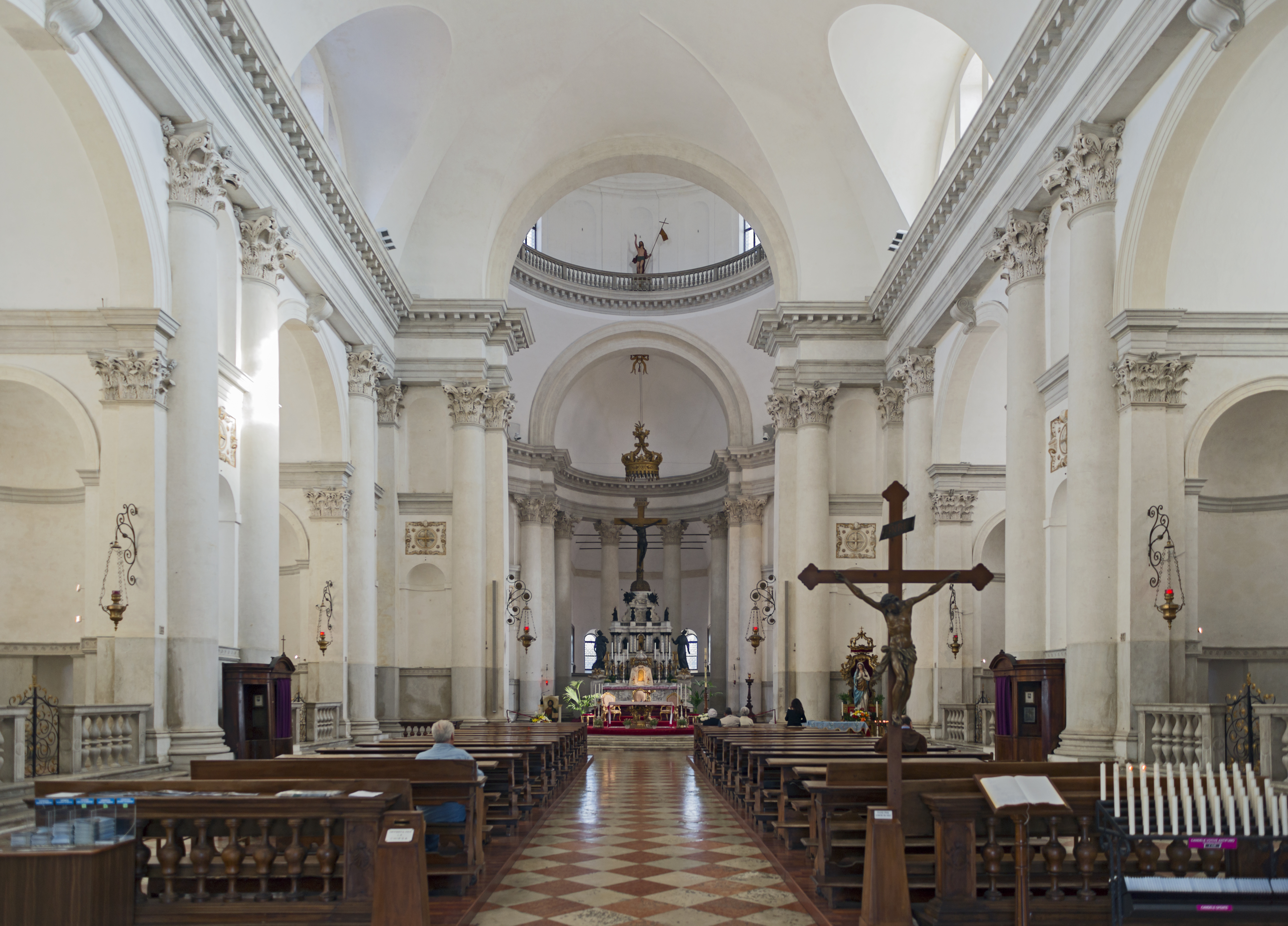
Interior of Il Redentore Church in Venice (1576)

=== Last church ===
The Tempieto Barbaro, built at the end of his life, was one of his most accomplished works. It was begun in 1580 as an addition to the Villa Barbaro at Maser. It unites two classical forms, a circle and a Greek cross. The facade features a particularly imposing classical portico, like that of the Pantheon in Rome, placed before two tall bell towers, before an even higher cupola, which covers the church itself. The effect is to draw the eye upward, level by level. Inside, the circular interior is surrounded by eight half-columns and niches with statues. An open balustrade runs around the top of the interior wall, concealing the base of the dome itself, making it appear that the dome is suspended in the air. This idea would be adopted frequently in later Baroque churches. He achieves a perfect balance between the circle and the cross, and the horizontal and vertical elements, both on the facade and in the interior.

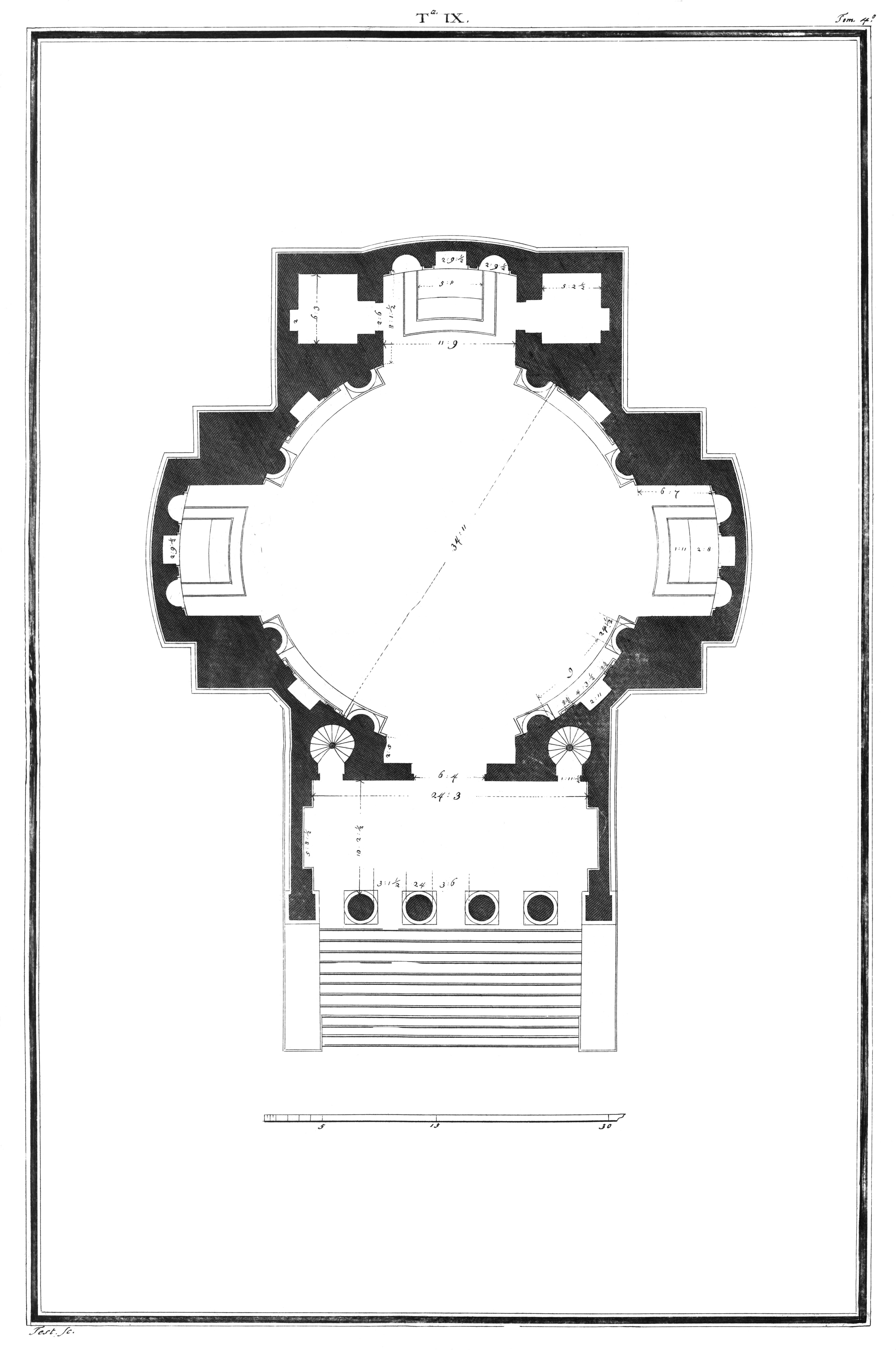
Plan by Ottavio Bertotti Scamozzi

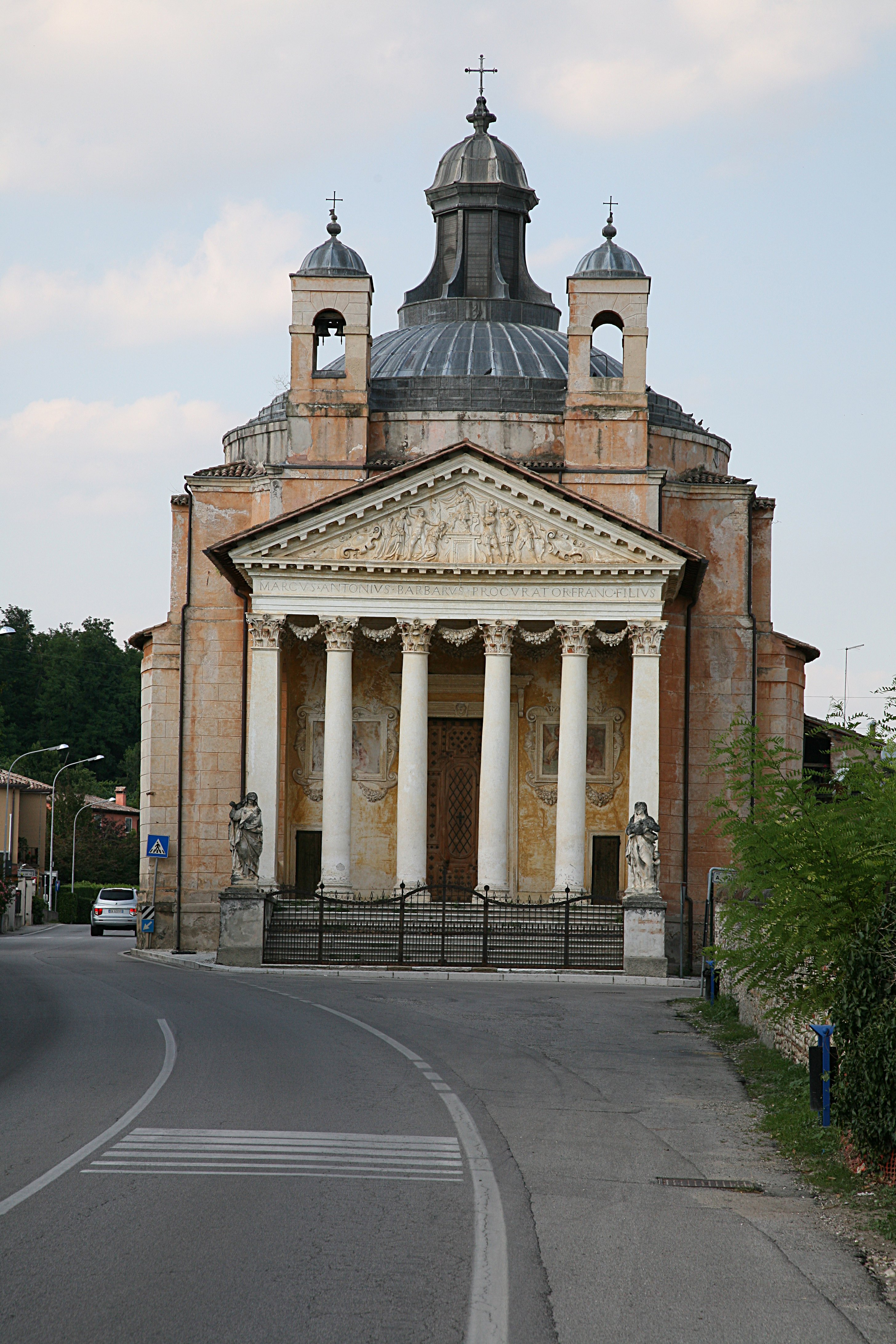
Facade of the Tempietto Barbaro

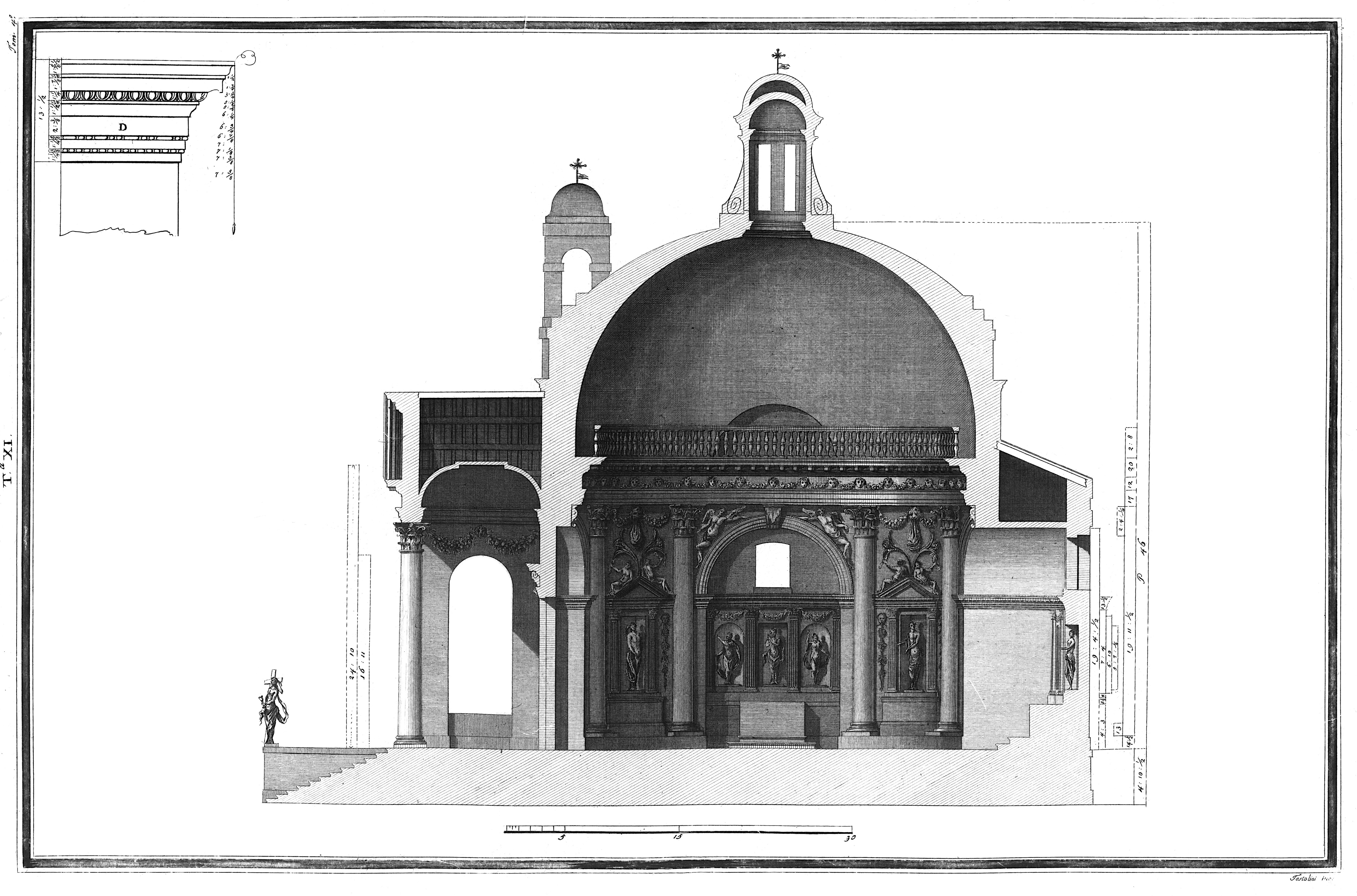
Section of the Tempietto Barbaro, drawn by Scamozzi (1783)

=== Last work ===
The final work of Palladio was the Teatro Olimpico in the Piazza Matteotti in Vicenza, built for the theatrical productions of the Olympic Society of Vicenza, of which Palladio was a member. He was asked to produce a design and model, and construction began in February 1580. The back wall of the stage was in the form of an enormous triumphal arch divided into three levels, and three portals through which actors could appear and disappear. This wall was lavishly decorated with columns and niches filled with statuary. The view through the arches gave the illusion of looking down classical streets. The painted ceiling was designed to give the illusion of sitting under an open sky. Behind the hemicycle of seats, Palladio placed a row of Corinthian columns.

Palladio died on 19 August 1580, not long after the work was begun. It was completed, with a number of modifications, by Vincenzo Scamozzi and inaugurated in 1584 with a performance of the tragedy Oedipus Rex by Sophocles.

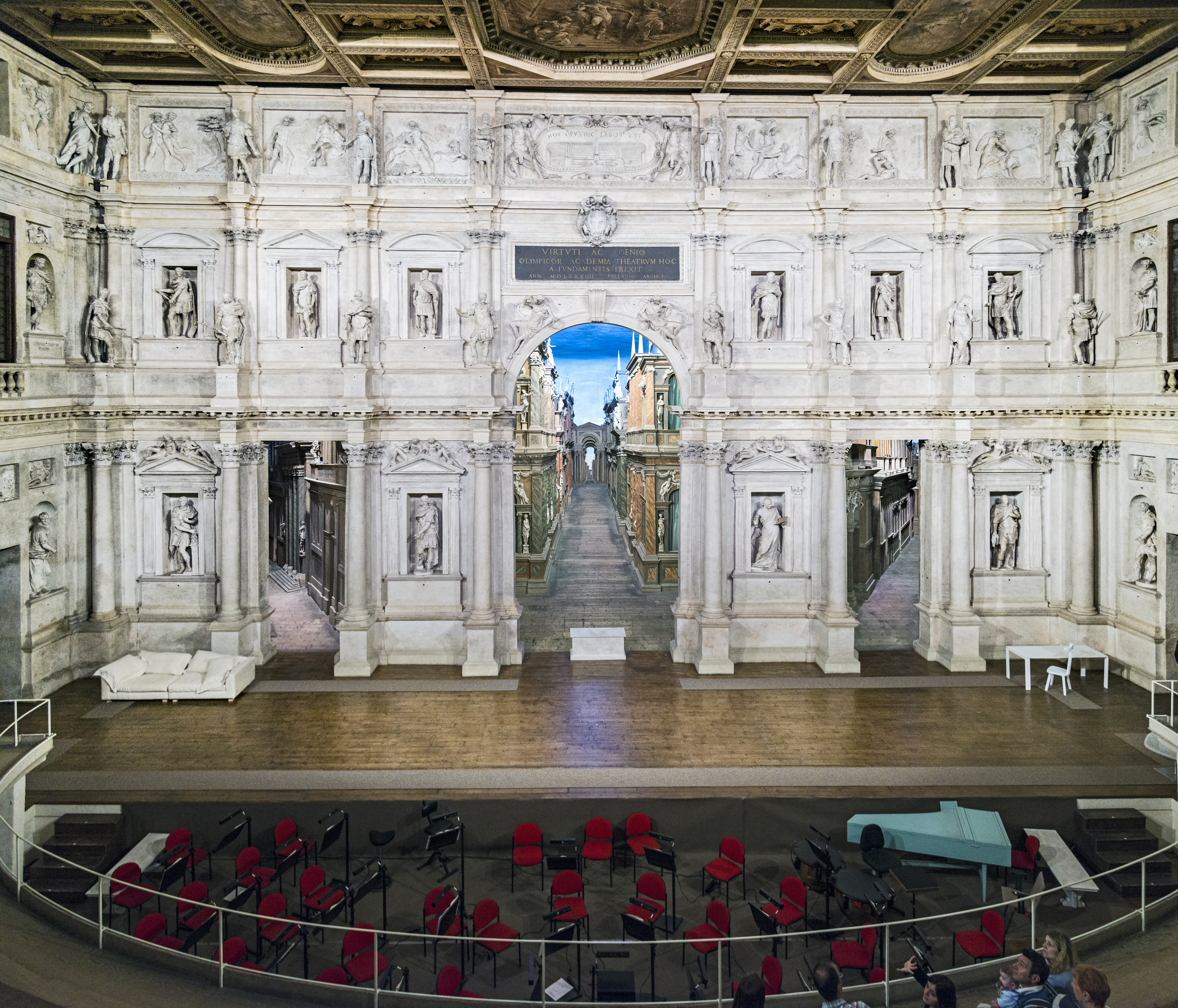
Stage with scenery designed by Vincenzo Scamozzi, who completed the theatre after the death of Palladio

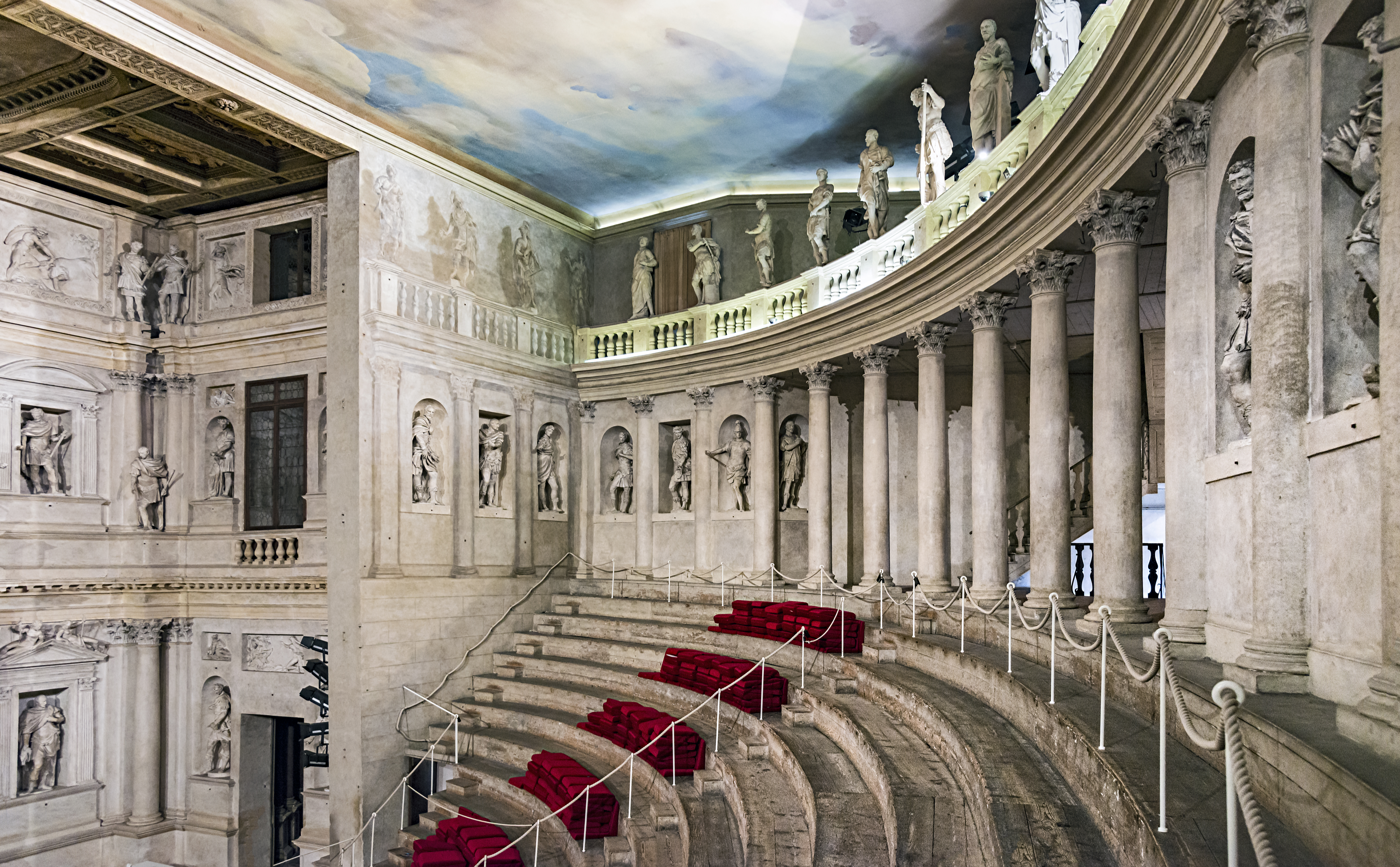
Stage and seating of his last work, the Teatro Olimpico (1584)

== Personal life ==
Very little is known of Palladio's personal life. Documents show that he received a dowry in April 1534 from the family of his wife, Allegradonna, the daughter of a carpenter. They had four sons: Leonida, Marcantonio, Orazio and Silla, and a daughter, Zenobia. Two of the sons, Leonida and Orazio, died during a short period in 1572, greatly affecting their father. He died on 19 August 1580 at either Vicenza or Maser, and was buried in the church of Santa Corona in Vicenza. In 1844, a new tomb was built in a chapel dedicated to him in that cemetery.

== Influence ==
Although all of Palladio's buildings are found in a relatively small corner of Italy, they had an influence far beyond. They particularly inspired neoclassical architects in Britain and in the United States in the 18th and 19th centuries. While he designed churches and urban palaces, his plans for villas and country houses were particularly admired and copied.

His books with their detailed illustrations and plans were especially influential. His first book, L'Antichida di Roma (Antiquities of Rome) was published in 1554. He then made architectural drawings to illustrate a book by his patron, Daniele Barbaro, a commentary on Vitruvius. His most famous work was I quattro libri dell'architettura (The Four Books of Architecture), published in 1570, which set out rules others could follow. The first book includes studies of decorative styles, classical orders, and materials. He illustrated a rich variety of columns, arcades, pediments, pilasters and other details which were soon adapted and copied. The second book included Palladio's town and country house designs and classical reconstructions. The third book had bridge and basilica designs, city planning designs, and classical halls. The fourth book included information on the reconstruction of ancient Roman temples. The books were translated into many languages, and went through many editions, well into the eighteenth and nineteenth centuries.

=== France and Germany ===
Palladio's style inspired several works by Claude Nicolas Ledoux in France, including the Royal Saltworks at Arc-et-Senans, begun in 1775. In Germany, Johann von Goethe in his Italian Journey described Palladio as a genius, declaring that his unfinished Convent of Santa Maria della Carità was the most perfect existing work of architecture. The German architects David Gilly and his son Friedrich Gilly were also admirers of Palladio, and constructed palaces for the King of Prussia Frederick-William III in the style, including the Paretz Palace. Friedrich Gilly's work, the National Theatre in Berlin (1798), built for Frederick the Great was in the style. Most of the buildings were destroyed during World War II.

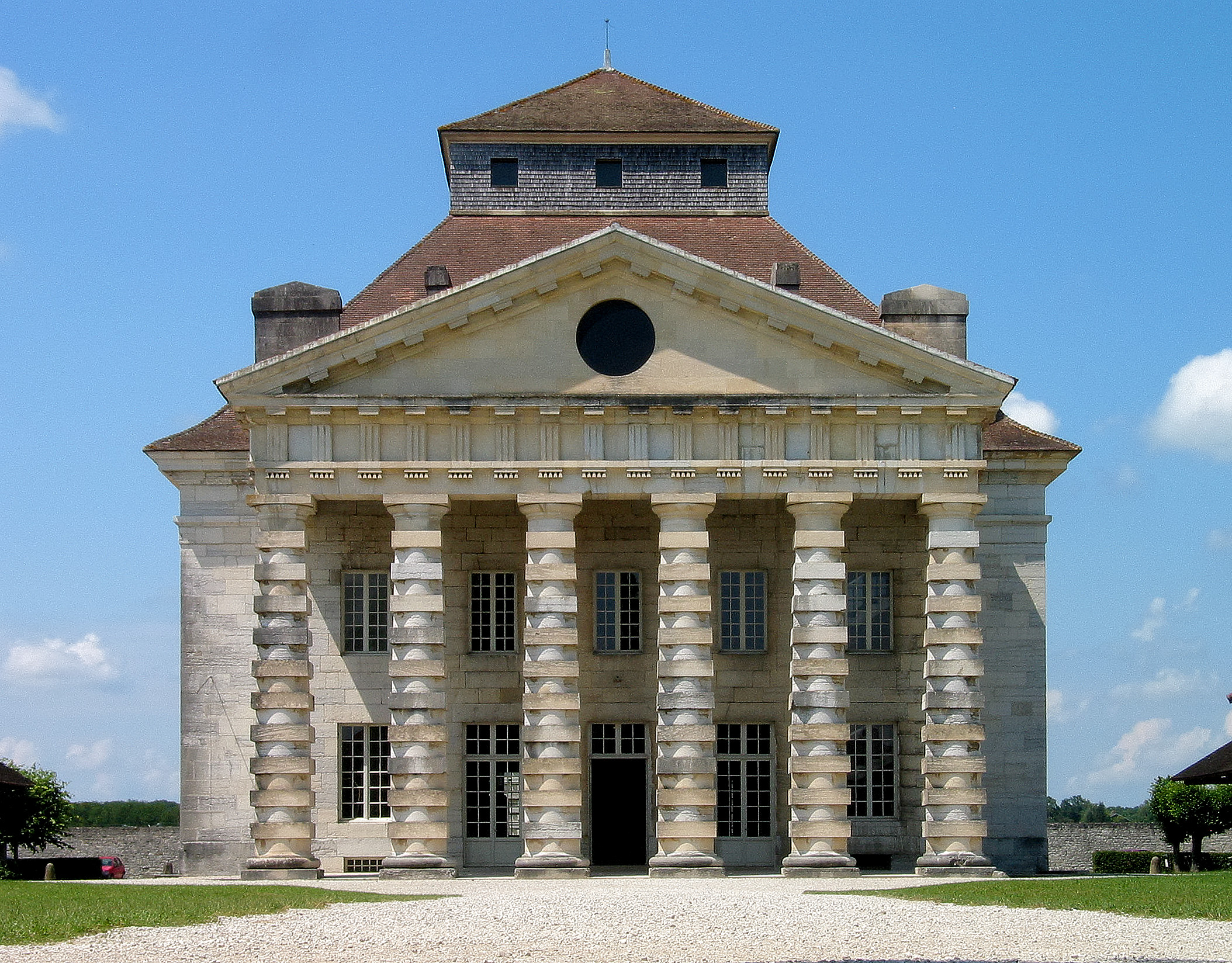
House of the Director of the Royal Saltworks at Arc-et-Senans, by Claude Nicolas Ledoux (1775)

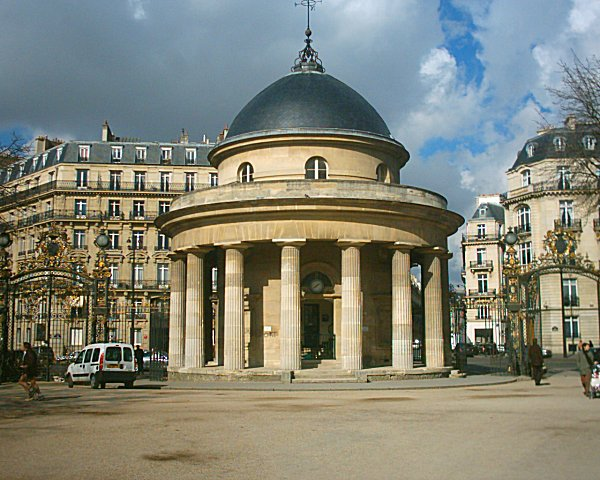
La Rotonde customs barrier, Parc Monceau, by Claude Nicolas Ledoux

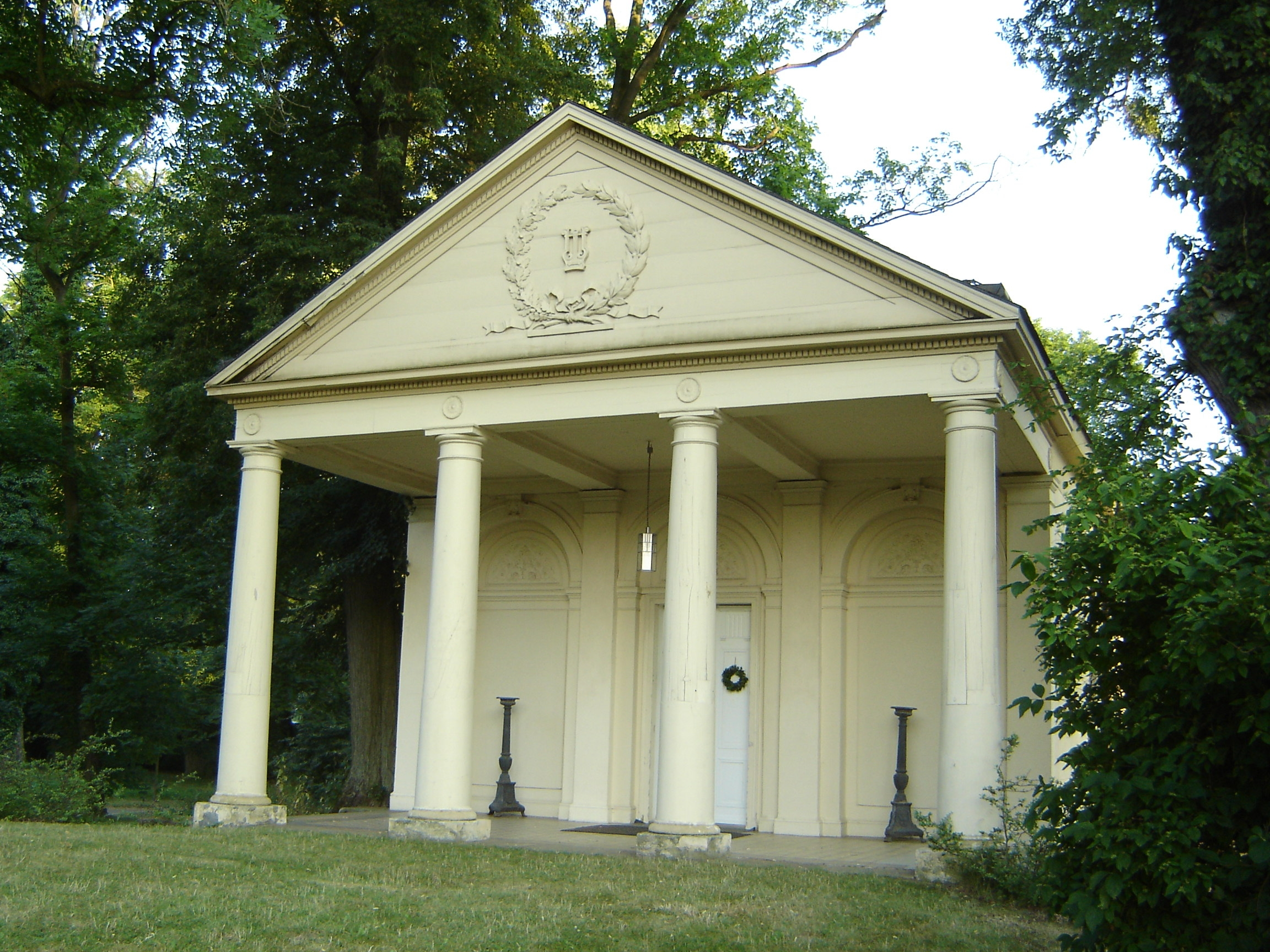
Palladian garden structure at Steinhöfel by David Gilly (1798)

=== England ===
Palladio's work was especially popular in England, where the villa style was adapted for country houses. The first English architect to adapt Palladio's work was Inigo Jones, who made a long trip to Vicenza and returned full of Palladian ideas. His first major work in the style was the Queen's House at Greenwich (1616–1635), modelled after Palladio's villas.

Wilton House is another adaptation of Palladio's villa plans. It had a particularly famous feature, the Palladio Bridge, designed around 1736. The bridge was extremely popular, and copies were made for other houses, including Stowe House. Another variation, the Marble Bridge, was made for Empress Catherine the Great of Russia for her gardens at Tsarskoe Selo near Saint Petersburg, Russia.

Other English architects, including Elizabeth Wilbraham, and Christopher Wren also embraced the Palladian style. Another English admirer was the architect, Richard Boyle, 4th Earl of Cork, also known as Lord Burlington, who, with William Kent, designed Chiswick House. The Italian-born Giacomo Leoni also constructed Palladian houses in England.

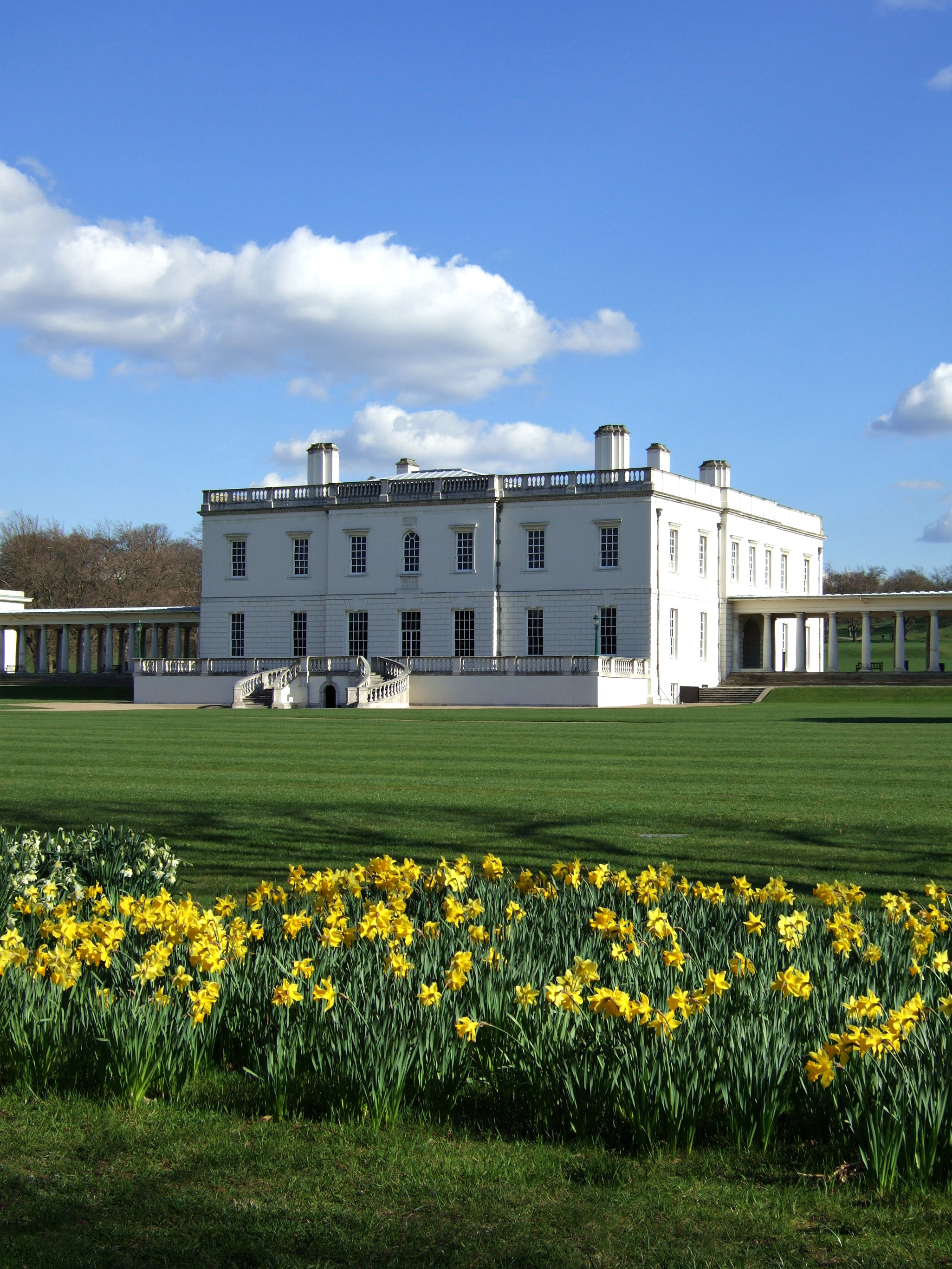
The Queen's House, Greenwich by Inigo Jones (1616–1635)

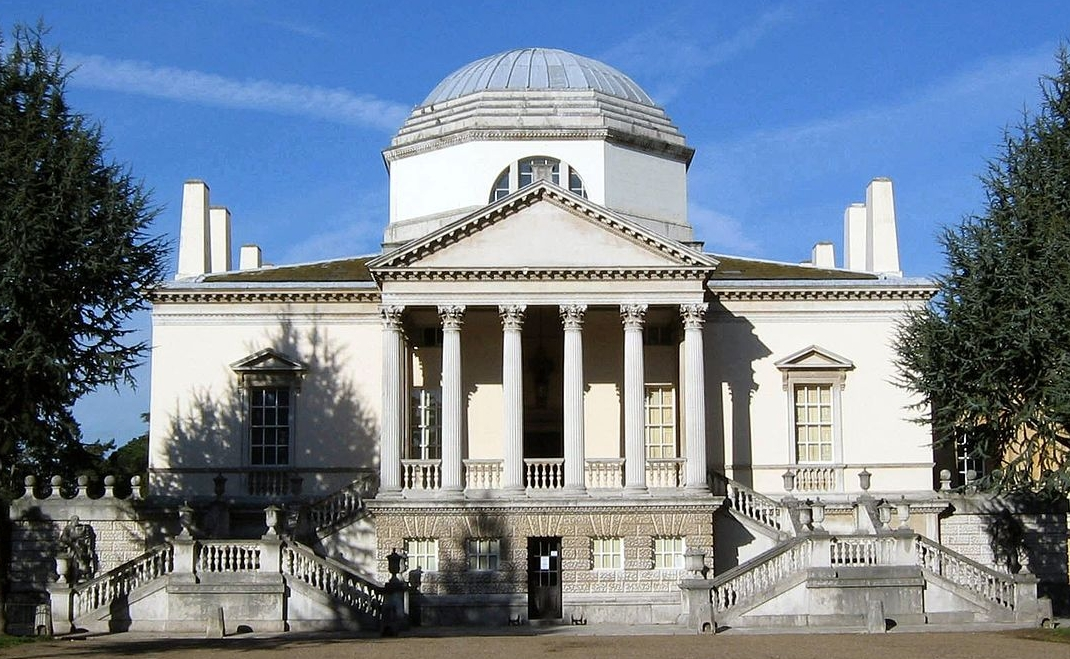
Chiswick House by Richard Boyle, 3rd Earl of Burlington and William Kent (completed 1729)

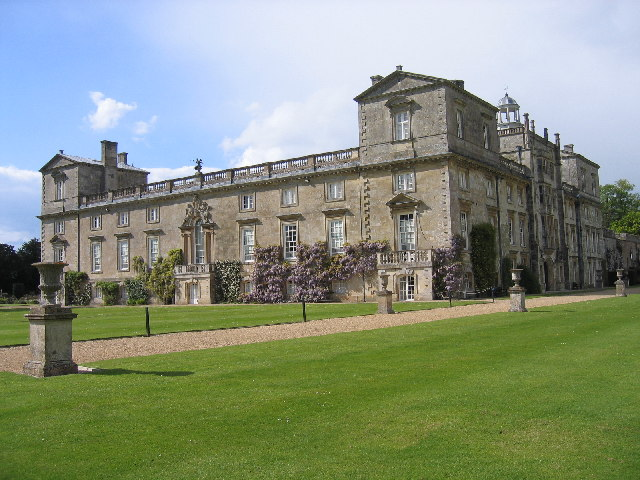
Wilton House south front by Inigo Jones (1650)

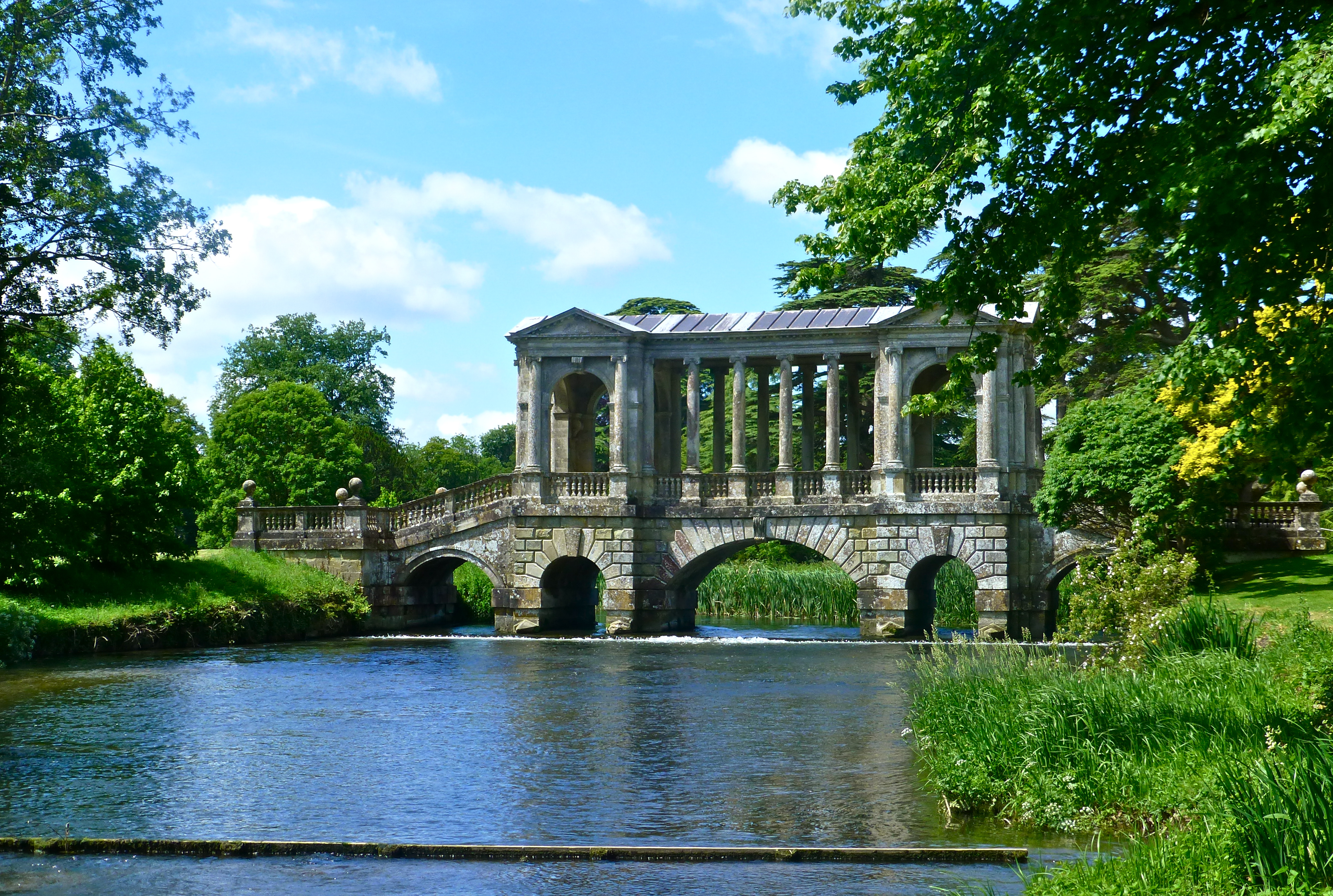
Palladio Bridge at Wilton House (1736–1737)

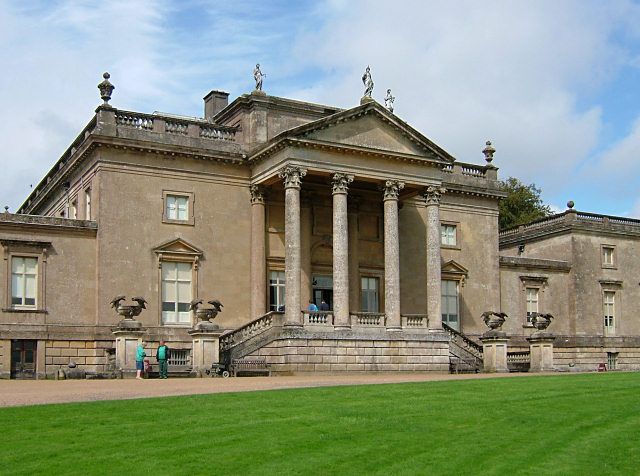
Stourhead House by Colen Campbell (1721–1724), inspired by Villa Capra

=== United States ===
The influence of Palladio also reached the United States, where the architecture and symbols of the Roman Republic were adapted for the architecture and institutions of the newly independent nation. The Massachusetts governor and architect Thomas Dawes also admired the style and used it when rebuilding Harvard Hall at Harvard University in 1766. Palladio's villas inspired Monticello, the residence of the third U.S. President, Thomas Jefferson, himself an architect. Jefferson organized a competition for the first United States Capitol building. It was won by William Thornton with a design inspired in part by Palladio and La Rotonda. The One Hundred Eleventh Congress of the United States of America called him the "Father of American Architecture" (Congressional Resolution no. 259 of 6 December 2010). His influence can also be seen in American plantation buildings.

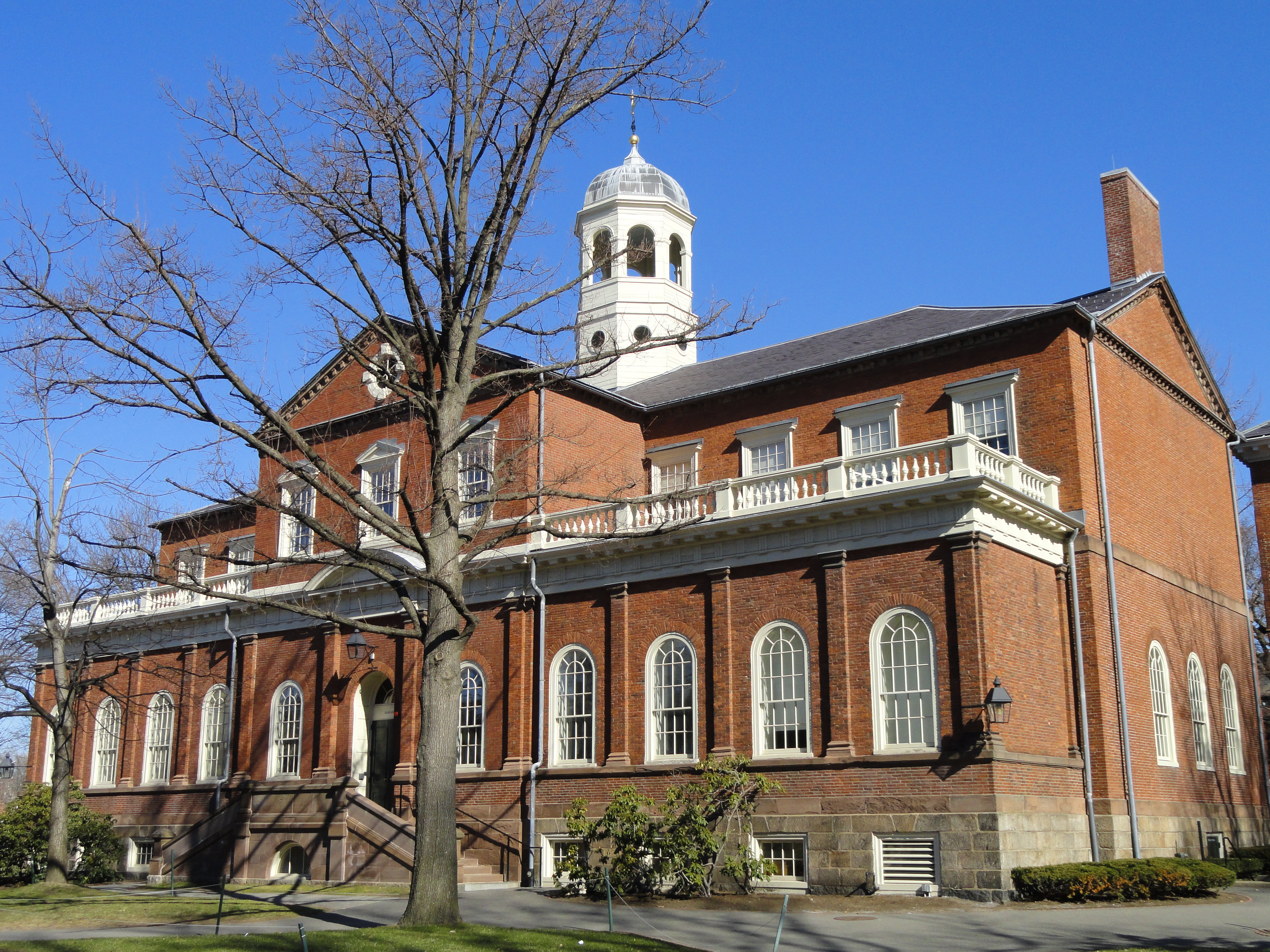
Harvard Hall at Harvard University by Thomas Dawes (1766)

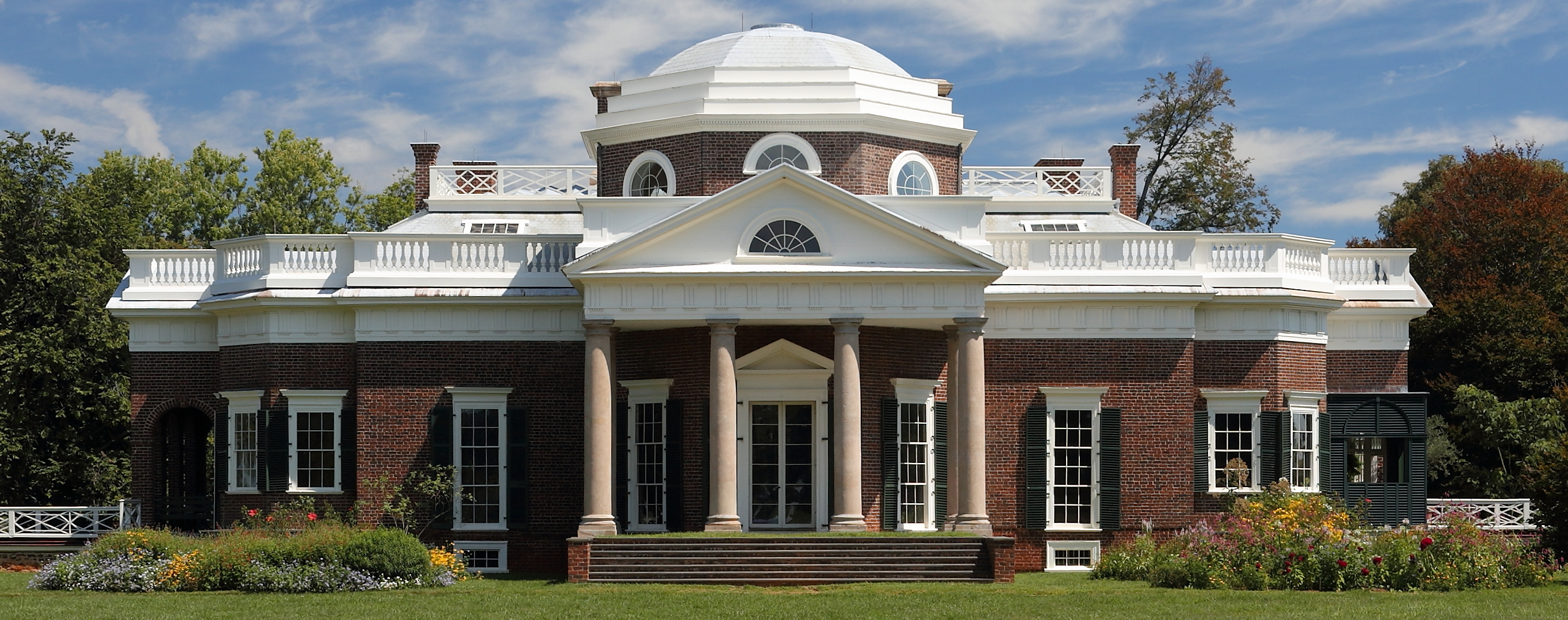
Monticello, residence of Thomas Jefferson (1772)

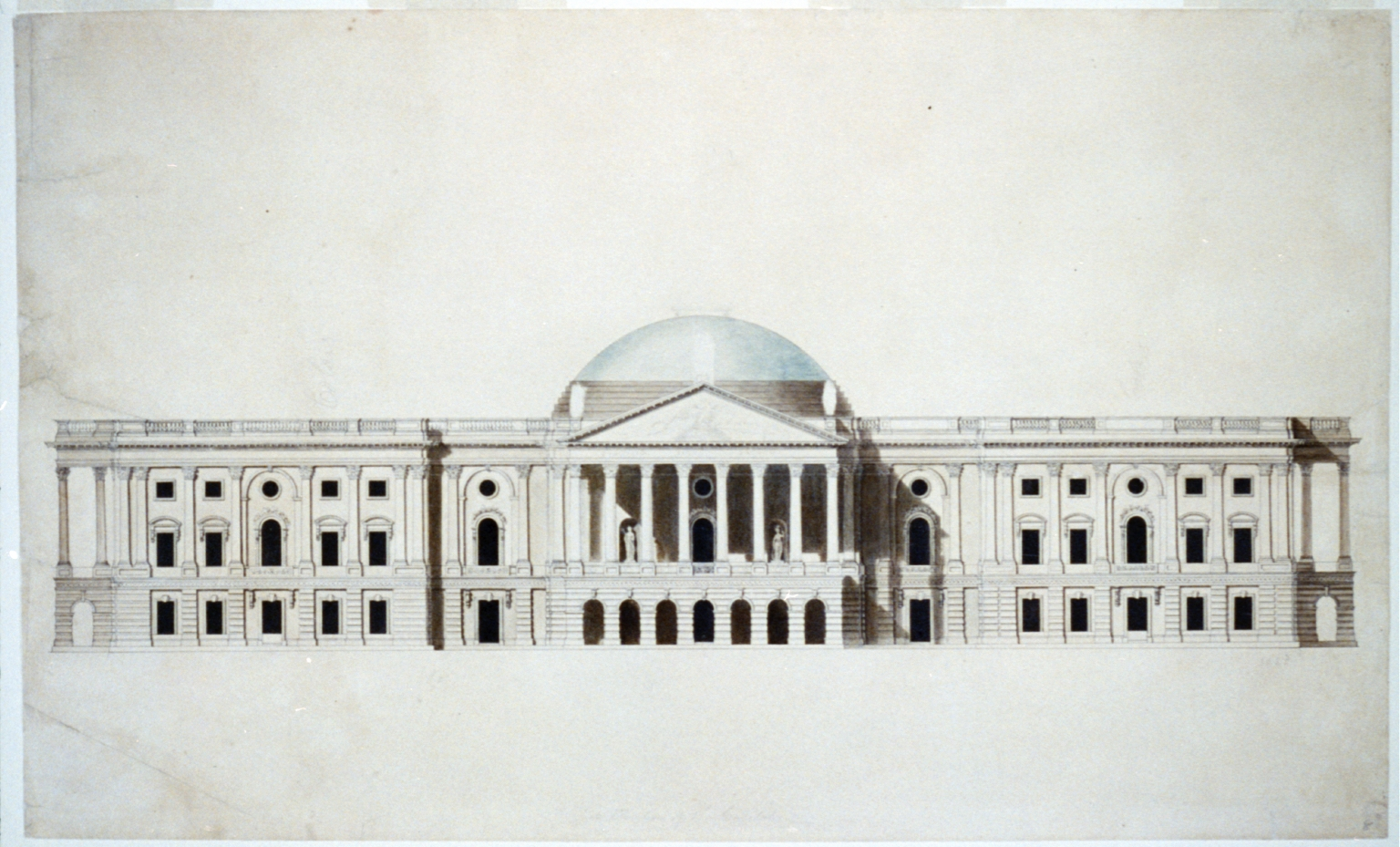
Winning design for the first United States Capitol by William Thornton (1793)

=== Archives ===
More than 330 of Palladio's original drawings and sketches still survive in the collections of the Royal Institute of British Architects, most of which originally were owned by Inigo Jones. Jones collected a significant number of these on his Grand Tour of 1613–1614, while some were a gift from Henry Wotton. An exhibition of some of the Royal Institute’s holdings was held in 2010 at the Morgan Library & Museum titled “Palladio and His Legacy: A Transatlantic Journey”.

The Center for Palladian Studies in America, Inc., a nonprofit membership organization, was founded in 1979 to research and promote understanding of Palladio's influence in the architecture of the United States.

== Palladian style ==
Palladio is known as one of the most influential architects in Western architecture. His architectural works have "been valued for centuries as the quintessence of High Renaissance calm and harmony".

The basic elements of Italian Renaissance architecture, including Doric columns, lintels, cornices, loggias, pediments and domes had already been used in the 15th century or earlier, before Palladio. They had been skillfully brought together by Brunelleschi in the Pazzi Chapel (1420) and the Medici-Riccardi Palace (1444–1449). At the beginning of the High Renaissance in the early 16th century, Bramante used these elements together in the Tempietto in Rome (1502), which combined a dome and a central plan based on a Greek Cross. The architect Baldassare Peruzzi had introduced the first Renaissance suburban villas, based on a Roman model and surrounded by gardens. The Farnese Palace in Rome (1530–1580) by Sangallo introduced a new kind of Renaissance palace, with monumental blocks, ornate cornices, lateral wings and multiple stairways. Michelangelo had made a plan for a central dome at Saint Peter's Basilica and added a new loggia to the facade of the Farnese Palace. All of these plans already existed before Palladio; his contribution was to refine, simplify, and use them in innovative ways.

The style of Palladio employed a classical repertoire of elements in new ways. He clearly expressed the function of each part of the building by its form, particularly elevating and giving precedence to the piano nobile, the ceremonial floor, of his villas and palaces. As much as possible he simplified the forms, as he did at Villa Capra "La Rotonda", surrounding a circular dome and interior with perfectly square facades, and placing the building pedestal to be more visible and more dramatic.

Palladio was inspired by classical Roman architecture, but he did not slavishly imitate it. He chose elements and assembled them in innovative ways appropriate to the site and function of the building. His buildings were often placed on pedestals, raising them and making them more visible, and so they could offer a view. The villas very often had loggias, covered arcades or walkways on the outside of upper levels, which gave a view of the scenery or city below, and also gave variety to the facade. When he designed his rustic villas and suburban villas, he paid particular attention to the site, integrating them as much as possible into nature, either by sites on hilltops or looking out at gardens or rivers.

The Serlian window, or Venetian window, also known as a Palladian window, was another common feature of his style, which he used both for windows and the arches of the loggias of his buildings. It consists of an arched window flanked by two smaller square windows, divided by two columns or pilasters and often topped by a small entablature and by a small circular window or hole, called an oculus. These particular features originally appeared in the triumphal arches of Rome, and had been used in the earlier Renaissance by Bramante, but Palladio used them in novel ways, particularly in the facade of the Basilica Palladiana and in the Villa Pojana. They also became a common feature of later Palladian buildings in England and elsewhere.

In his later work, particularly the Palazzo Valmarana and the Palazzo del Capitaniato in Vicenza, his style became more ornate and more decorative, with more sculptural decoration on the facade, tending toward Mannerism. His buildings in this period were examples of the transition beginning to what would become Baroque architecture.

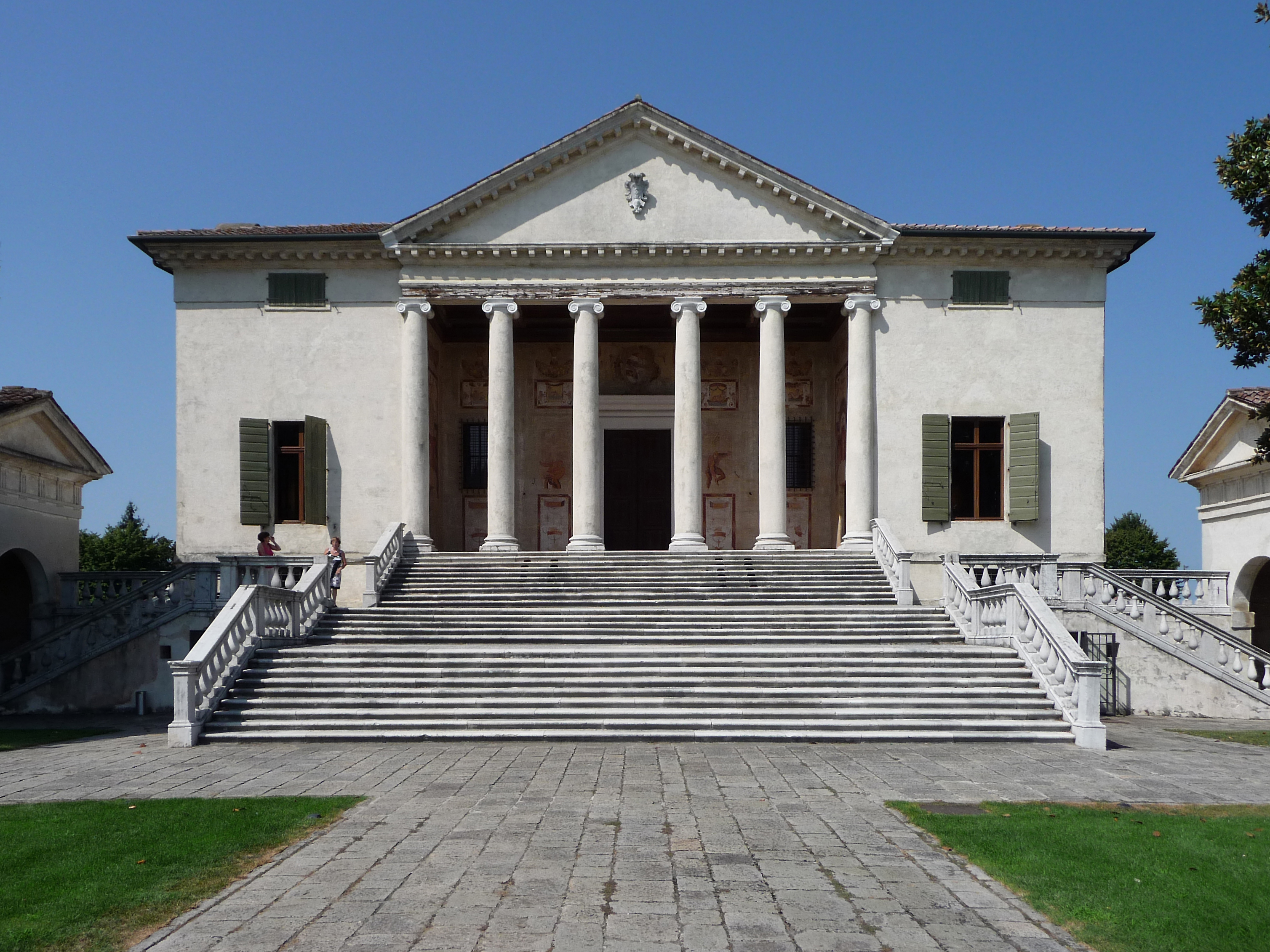
Clarity and harmony. Villa Badoer (1556–1563), an early use by Palladio of the elements of a Roman temple

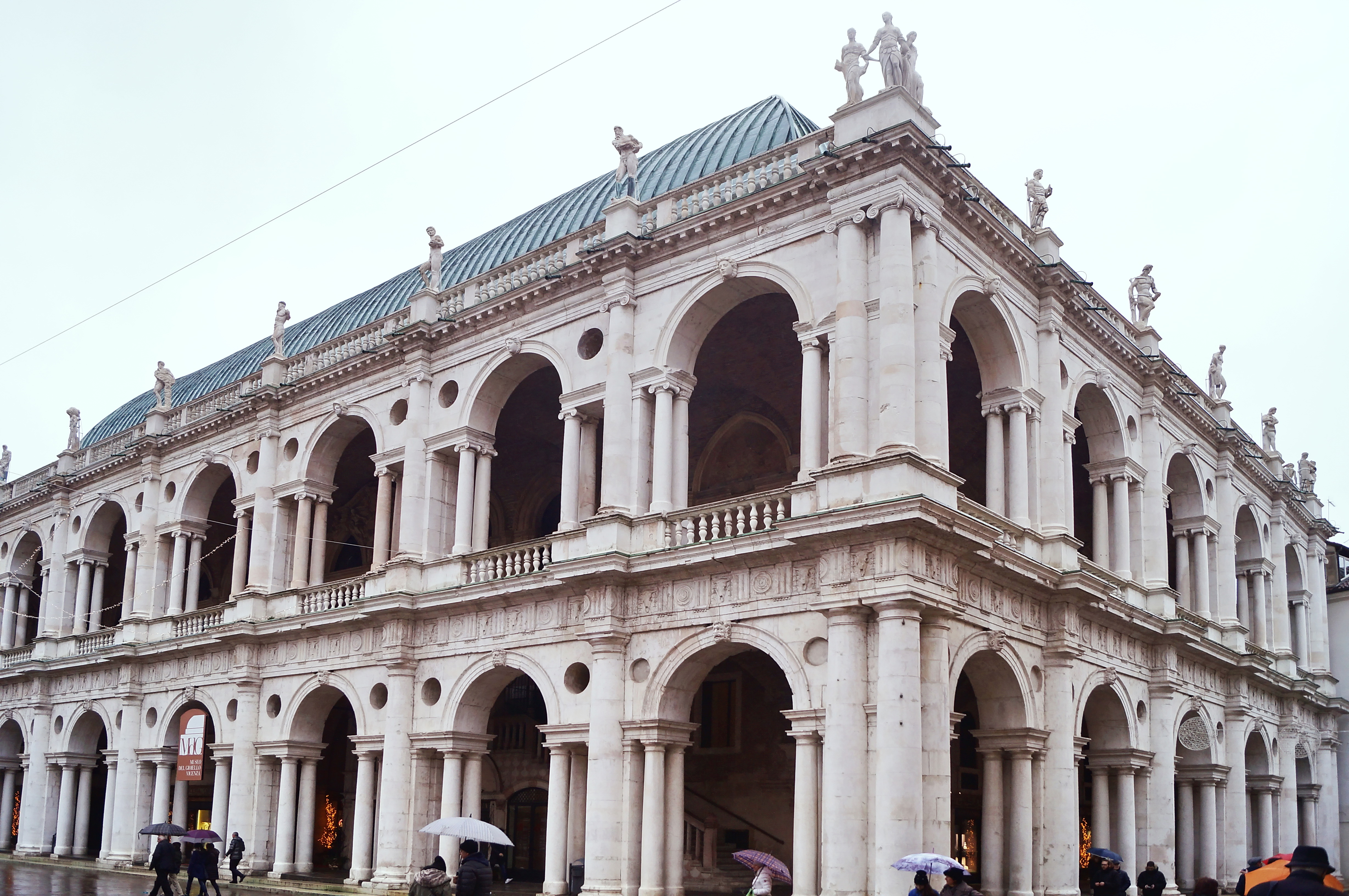
The Basilica Palladiana, Vicenza, (begun 1546) with arched Palladian window and round oculi to the loggia.

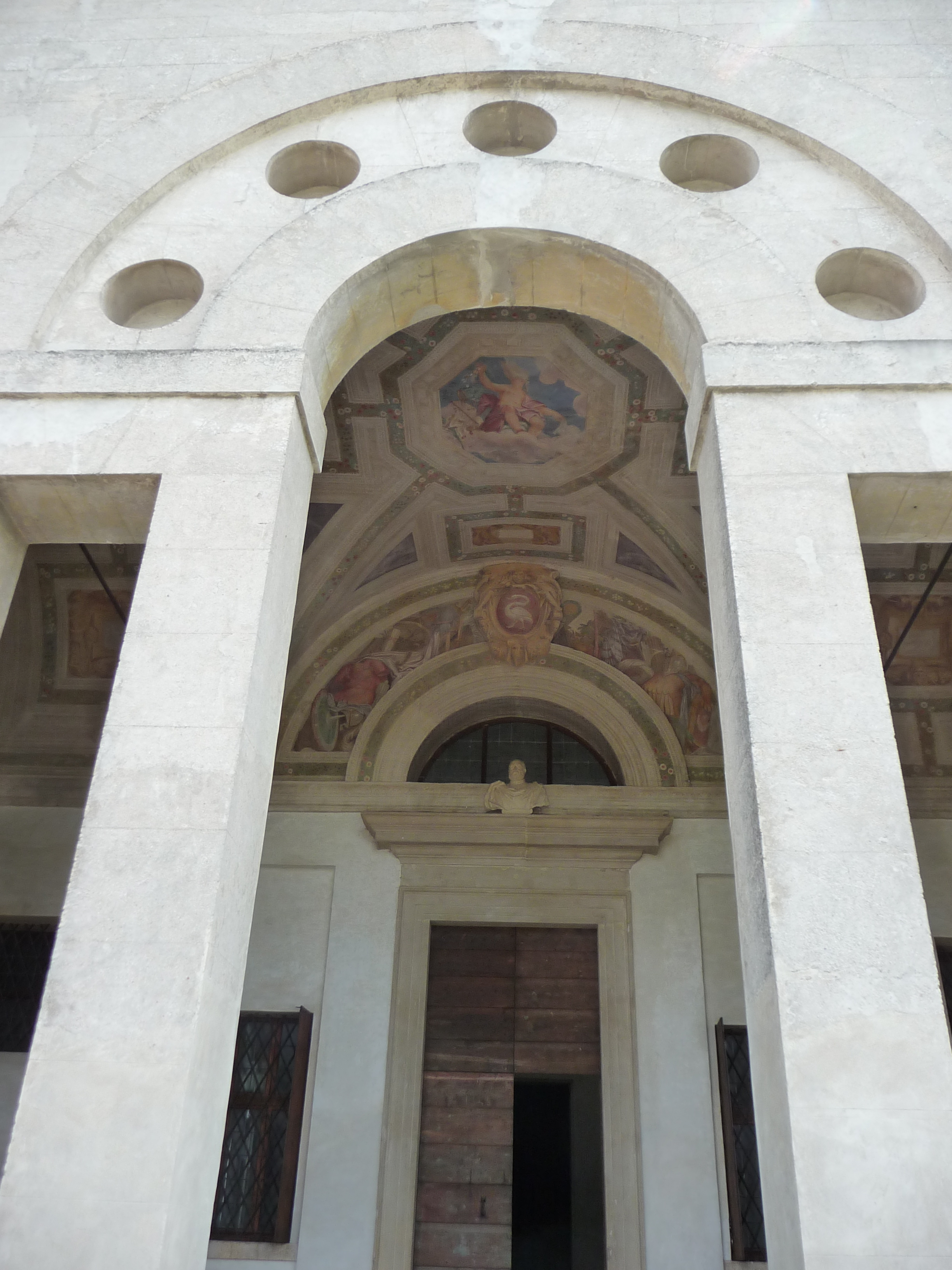
A variation of the Palladian or Venetian window, with round oculi, at Villa Pojana (1548–1549)

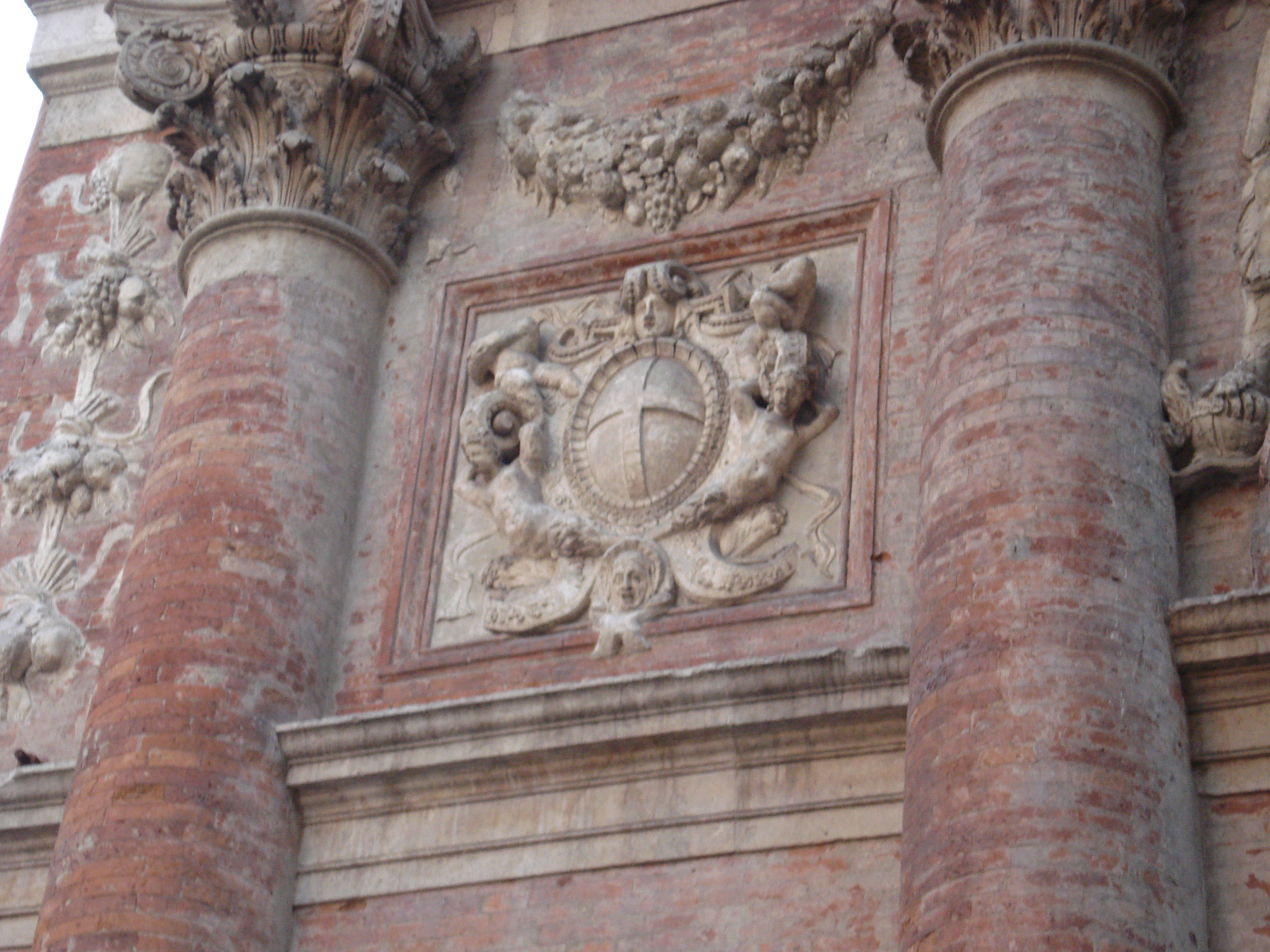
Late Palladio style, Mannerist decoration on the facade of the Palazzo del Capitanio (1565–1572)

== Characteristics ==
Palladio's architecture was not dependent on expensive materials, which must have been an advantage to his more financially pressed clients. Many of his buildings are of brick covered with stucco. Stuccoed brickwork was always used in his villa designs in order to give the appearance of a classical Roman structure.

His success as an architect is based not only on the beauty of his work, but also on its harmony with the culture of his time. His success and influence came from the integration of extraordinary aesthetic quality with expressive characteristics that resonated with his clients' social aspirations. His buildings served to communicate, visually, their place in the social order of their culture. This powerful integration of beauty and the physical representation of social meanings is apparent in three major building types: the urban palazzo, the agricultural villa, and the church.

Relative to his trips to Rome, Palladio developed three main palace types by 1556. In 1550, the Palazzo Chiericati was completed. The proportions for the building were based on musical ratios for adjacent rooms. The building was centralized by a tripartite division of a series of columns or colonnades. In 1552, the Palazzo Porto located in Vicenza was rebuilt incorporating the Roman Renaissance element for façades. A colonnade of Corinthian columns surrounded a main court. The Palazzo Antonini in Udine, constructed in 1556, had a centralized hall with four columns and service spaces placed relatively toward one side. He used styles of incorporating the six columns, supported by pediments, into the walls as part of the façade. This technique had been applied in his villa designs as well. Palladio experimented with the plan of the Palazzo Porto by incorporating it into the Palazzo Thiene. It was an earlier project from 1545 to 1550 and remained uncompleted due to elaborate elevations in his designs. He used Mannerist elements such as stucco surface reliefs and large columns, often extending two stories high.

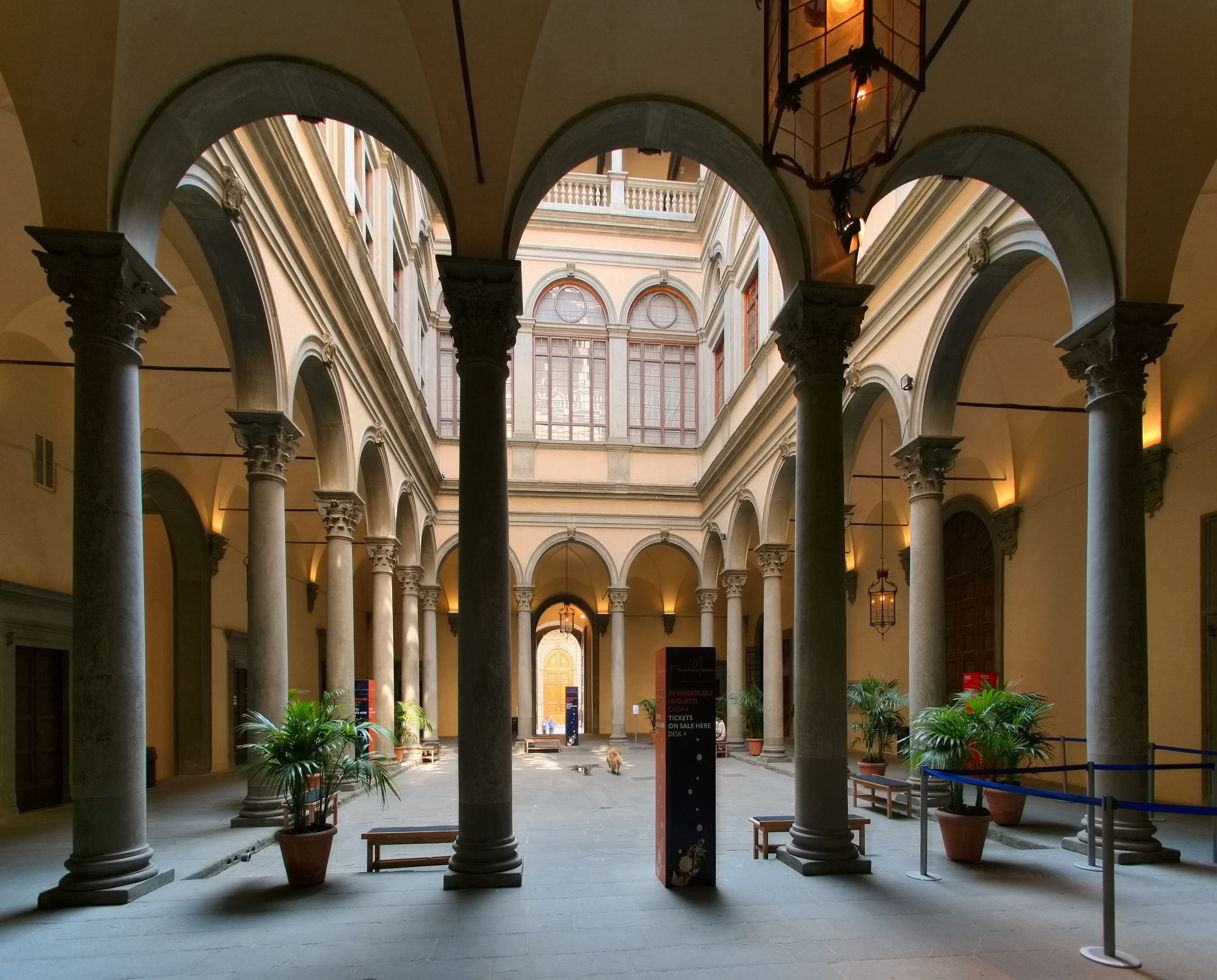
Palazzo Strozzi courtyard

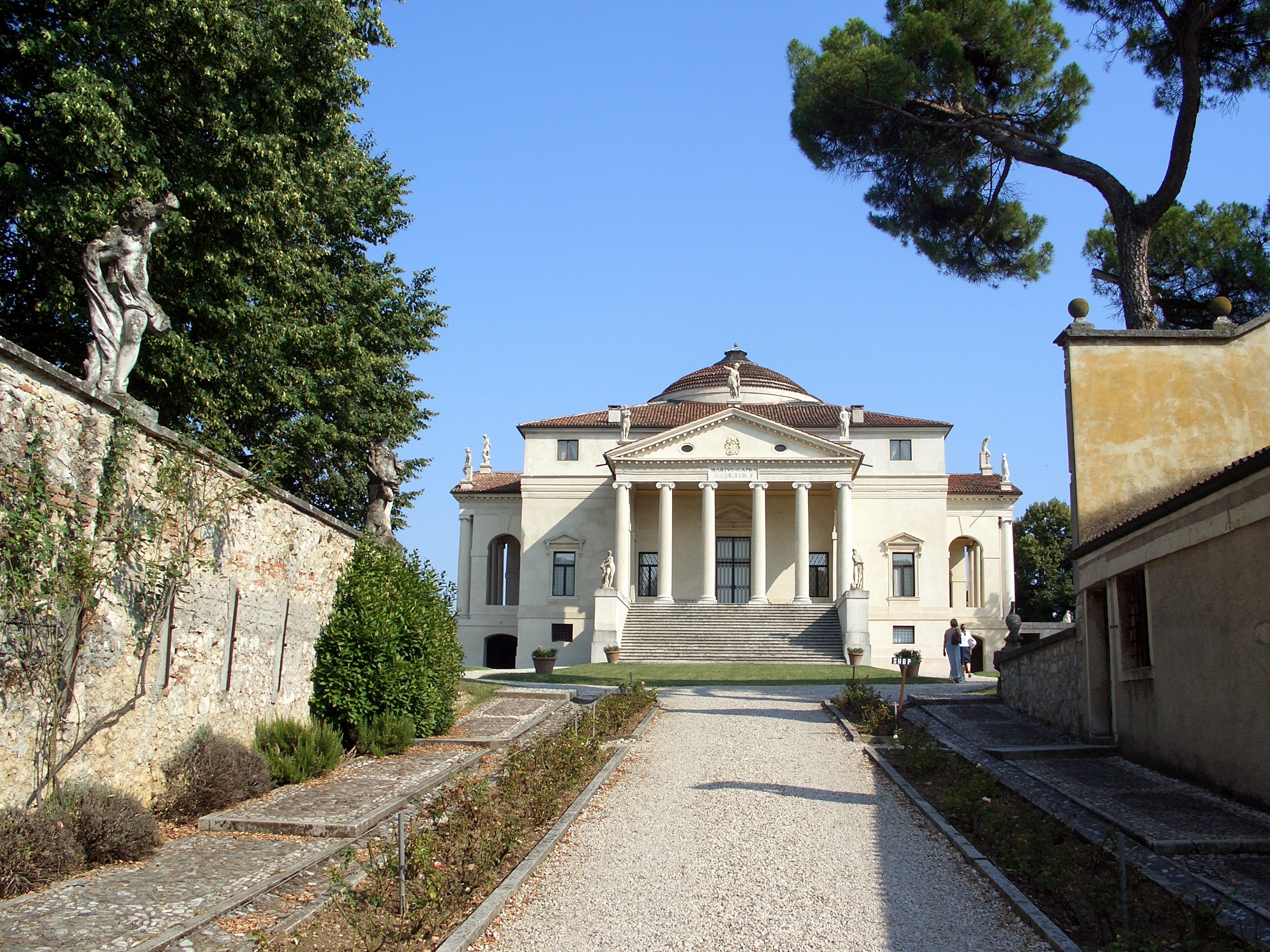
Villa Capra "La Rotonda" outside Vicenza

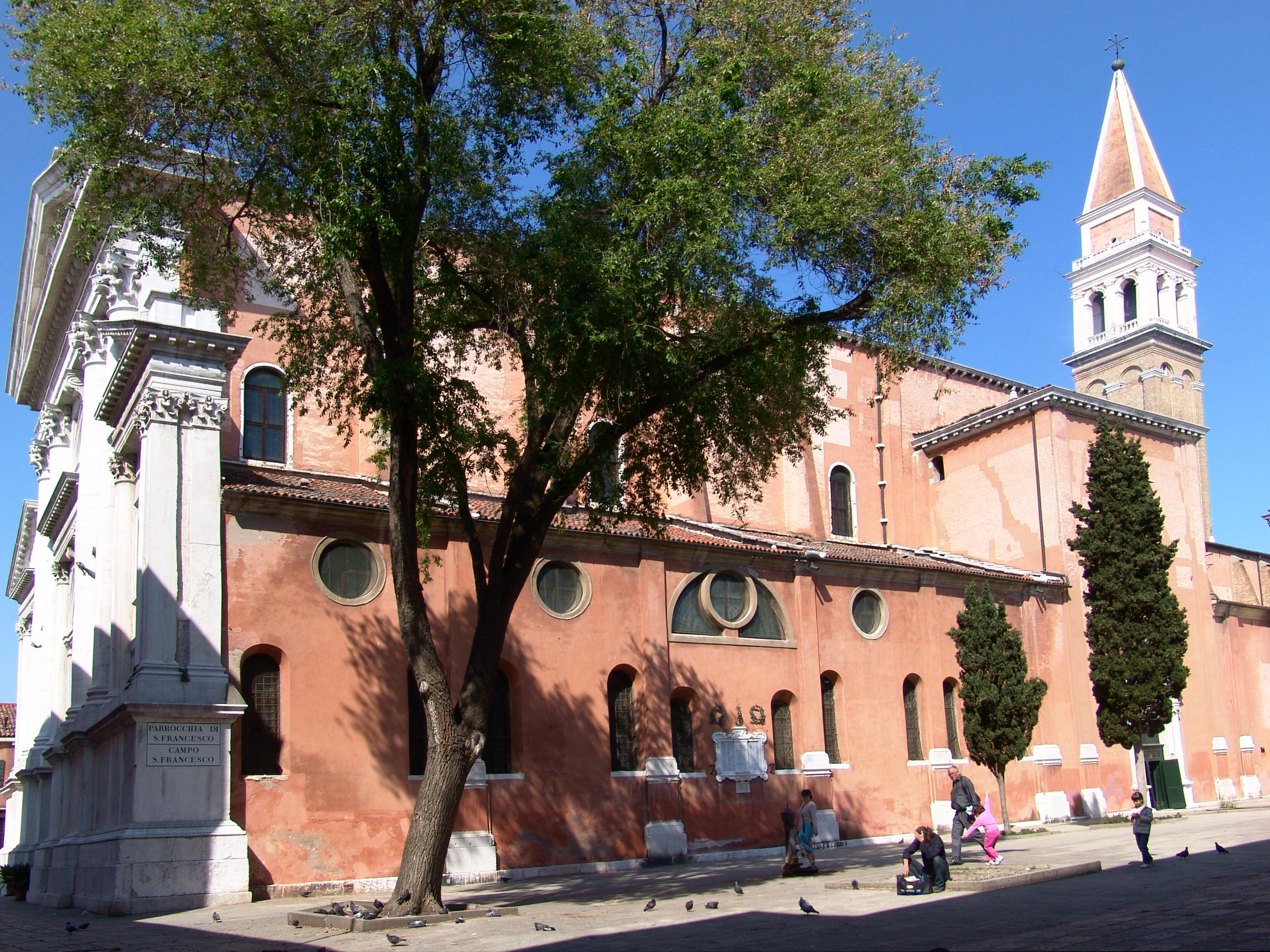
San Francesco della Vigna in Venice

In his urban structures, he developed a new improved version of the typical early Renaissance palazzo (exemplified by the Palazzo Strozzi). Adapting a new urban palazzo type created by Bramante in the House of Raphael, Palladio found a powerful expression of the importance of the owner and his social position. The main living quarters of the owner on the second level were clearly distinguished in importance by the use of a pedimented classical portico, centred and raised above the subsidiary and utilitarian ground level (illustrated in the Palazzo Porto and the Palazzo Valmarana). The tallness of the portico was achieved by incorporating the owner's sleeping quarters on the third level, within a giant two-story classical colonnade, a motif adapted from Michelangelo's Capitoline buildings in Rome. The elevated main floor level became known as the piano nobile, and is still referred to as the "first floor" in Europe.

Palladio also established an influential new building format for the agricultural villas of the Venetian aristocracy. Palladio's approach to his villa designs was not relative to his experience in Rome. His designs were based on practicality and employed few reliefs. He consolidated the various stand-alone farm outbuildings into a single impressive structure, arranged as a highly organized whole, dominated by a strong centre and symmetrical side wings, as illustrated at Villa Barbaro. In the project of the Villa Barbaro, Palladio most likely was also engaged in the interior decoration. Alongside the painter Paolo Veronese, he invented the complex and sophisticated illusionistic landscape paintings that cover the walls of various rooms.

The Villa Capra "La Rotonda" of 1552, outside Vicenza, was constructed as a summer house with views from all four sides. The plan has centralized circular halls with wings and porticos expanding on all four sides. Palladio began to implement the classical temple front into his design of façades for villas. He felt that to make an entry appear grand, the Roman temple front would be the most suitable style. The Palladian villa configuration often consists of a centralized block raised on an elevated podium, accessed by grand steps, and flanked by lower service wings, as at Villa Foscari and Villa Badoer. This format, with the quarters of the owners at the elevated centre of their own world, found resonance as a prototype for Italian villas and later for the country estates of the British nobility (such as Lord Burlington's Chiswick House, Vanbrugh's Blenheim, Walpole's Houghton Hall, and Adam's Kedleston Hall and Paxton House in Scotland). His villas were used by a capitalist gentry who developed an interest in agriculture and land. The configuration was a perfect architectural expression of their worldview, clearly expressing their perceived position in the social order of the times. His influence was extended worldwide into the British colonies.

Palladio developed his own prototype for the plan of the villas that was flexible to moderate in scale and function. The Palladian villa format was easily adapted for a democratic worldview, as may be seen in Thomas Jefferson's Monticello and his arrangement for the University of Virginia. It also may be seen applied as recently as 1940 in Pope's National Gallery in Washington D.C., where the public entry to the world of high culture occupies the exalted centre position. The rustication of exposed basement walls of Victorian residences is a late remnant of the Palladian format, clearly expressed as a podium for the main living space for the family.

Similarly, Palladio created a new configuration for the design of Catholic churches that established two interlocking architectural orders, each clearly articulated, yet delineating a hierarchy of a larger order overriding a lesser order. This idea was in direct coincidence with the rising acceptance of the theological ideas of St. Thomas Aquinas, who postulated the notion of two worlds existing simultaneously: the divine world of faith, and the earthly world of humans. Palladio created an architecture which made a visual statement communicating the idea of two superimposed systems, as illustrated at San Francesco della Vigna. In a time when religious dominance in Western culture was threatened by the rising power of science and secular humanists, this architecture found great favor with the Catholic Church as a clear statement of the proper relationship of the earthly and the spiritual worlds.

Aside from Palladio's designs, his publications further contributed to Palladianism. During the second half of his life, Palladio published many books on architecture, most famously, I quattro libri dell'architettura (The Four Books of Architecture, Venice, 1570).

== Chronology of the works ==
Note: The first date given is the beginning of the project, not its completion.

=== Villas ===
- 1534 (built 1534–1538): Villa Trissino a Cricoli, Vicenza (once traditionally attributed, but probably designed by Gian Giorgio Trissino)
- 1537 (built 1539–1557): Villa Godi, for Girolamo, Pietro and Marcantonio Godi, Lonedo di Lugo di Vicenza
- c. 1539 (built 1539–1587): Villa Piovene, Lonedo di Lugo di Vicenza, Province of Vicenza (uncertain attribution)
- Before 1542 (built 1542–c. 1550): Villa Gazzotti, for Taddeo Gazzotti, Bertesina, Vicenza
- 1542 (built 1542–1560): Villa Valmarana, for Giuseppe and Antonio Valmarana, Vigardolo di Monticello Conte Otto, Province of Vicenza
- 1542 (built 1542–1545): Villa Pisani, for Vettore, Marco and Daniele Pisani, Bagnolo di Lonigo, Province of Vicenza
- 1542 ? (built before 1545–1550): Villa Thiene, for Marcantonio e Adriano Thiene, Quinto Vicentino, Province of Vicenza (probably a re-elaboration of a project by Giulio Romano)
- c. 1546: Villa Contarini degli Scrigni, for Paolo Contarini and brothers, Piazzola sul Brenta, Province of Padua (attributed)
- 1547 (built 1547, 1565): Villa Arnaldi, for Vincenzo Arnaldi, Meledo di Sarego, Province of Vicenza (unfinished)
- c. 1548 (built 1548–before 1555): Villa Saraceno, for Biagio Saraceno, Finale di Agugliaro, Province of Vicenza
- 1548 (built 1554–1556): Villa Angarano, for Giacomo Angarano, Bassano del Grappa, Province of Vicenza (main body of the villa later rebuilt by Baldassarre Longhena; the barchesse are part of the original)
- 1549 (built 1549–1563): Villa Pojana, for Bonifacio Pojana, Pojana Maggiore, Province of Vicenza
- After 1550 (built c. 1555–1584): Villa Chiericati, for Giovanni Chiericati, Vancimuglio di Grumolo delle Abbadesse, Province of Vicenza (completed in 1584 by Domenico Groppino after Palladio's death)
- 1552 (built 1552; 1569; 1588): Villa Cornaro, for Giorgio Cornaro, Piombino Dese, Province of Padua
- c. 1552 (built 1552–1555): Villa Pisani, for Francesco Pisani, Montagnana, Province of Padua
- c. 1553: Villa Ragona Cecchetto, per Girolamo Ragona, Ghizzole di Montegaldella, Province of Padua (unbuilt project)
- c. 1553 (built 1553–1554; 1575): Villa Trissino, Meledo di Sarego, Province of Vicenza (only partially realized)
- 1554 (built 1554–1558): Villa Porto, for Paolo Porto, Vivaro di Dueville, Province of Vicenza (attributed)
- c. 1554 (built 1554–1558): Villa Barbaro, for Daniele and Marcantonio Barbaro, Maser, Province of Treviso
- 1554 ? (built 1560–1565): Villa Foscari called "La Malcontenta", for Nicolò and Alvise Foscari, Malcontenta di Mira, Province of Venice
- 1554 ? (built: 1555 ?): Villa Zeno, for Marco Zeno, Donegal di Cessalto, Province of Treviso
- 1554 ? (built 1560–1564): Villa Mocenigo "sopra la Brenta", Dolo, Province of Venice) (demolished)
- 1554 – c. 1555 (built before 1556): Villa Badoer called "La Badoera", for Francesco Badoer, Fratta Polesine, Province of Rovigo
- before 1556 (built 1559–1565): Villa Emo, for Leonardo Emo, Fanzolo di Vedelago, Province of Treviso
- 1556 (built 1563–1567): Villa Thiene, for Francesco Thiene and sons, Cicogna di Villafranca Padovana, Province of Padua (unfinished; only a barchessa remaining)
- 1560 ? (built after 1563–before 1565; after 1570 ?): Villa Repeta, for Mario Repeta, Piazza Vecchia, Campiglia dei Berici, Province of Vicenza (destroyed by a fire, then rebuilt in other shape in 1672)
- c. 1561 (built before 1569): Big barchesse of villa Pisani, Bagnolo di Lonigo, Province of Vicenza (attributed; destroyed)
- 1562 (built 1564–1566): Villa Sarego called "La Miga", for Annibale Serego, Miega di Cologna Veneta, Province of Verona (unfinished, demolished in the 1920s)
- c 1563 (built 1564–1566): Villa Valmarana, for Gianfrancesco Valmarana, Lisiera di Bolzano Vicentino, Province of Vicenza
- After 1564 (built 1565–1570): Villa Forni Cerato, for Girolamo Forni, Montecchio Precalcino, Province of Vicenza
- 1565 (built 1565–c. 1585): Villa Serego, for Marcantonio Serègo, Santa Sofia di Pedemonte di San Pietro in Cariano, Province of Verona
- 1566 – 1567 (built 1567–1605): Villa Almerico Capra called "La Rotonda", for Paolo Almerico, Vicenza (completed in 1585 by Vincenzo Scamozzi after Palladio's death)
- 1570 (built 1572–1580): Villa Porto, for Iseppo da Porto, Molina di Malo, Province of Vicenza (unfinished)
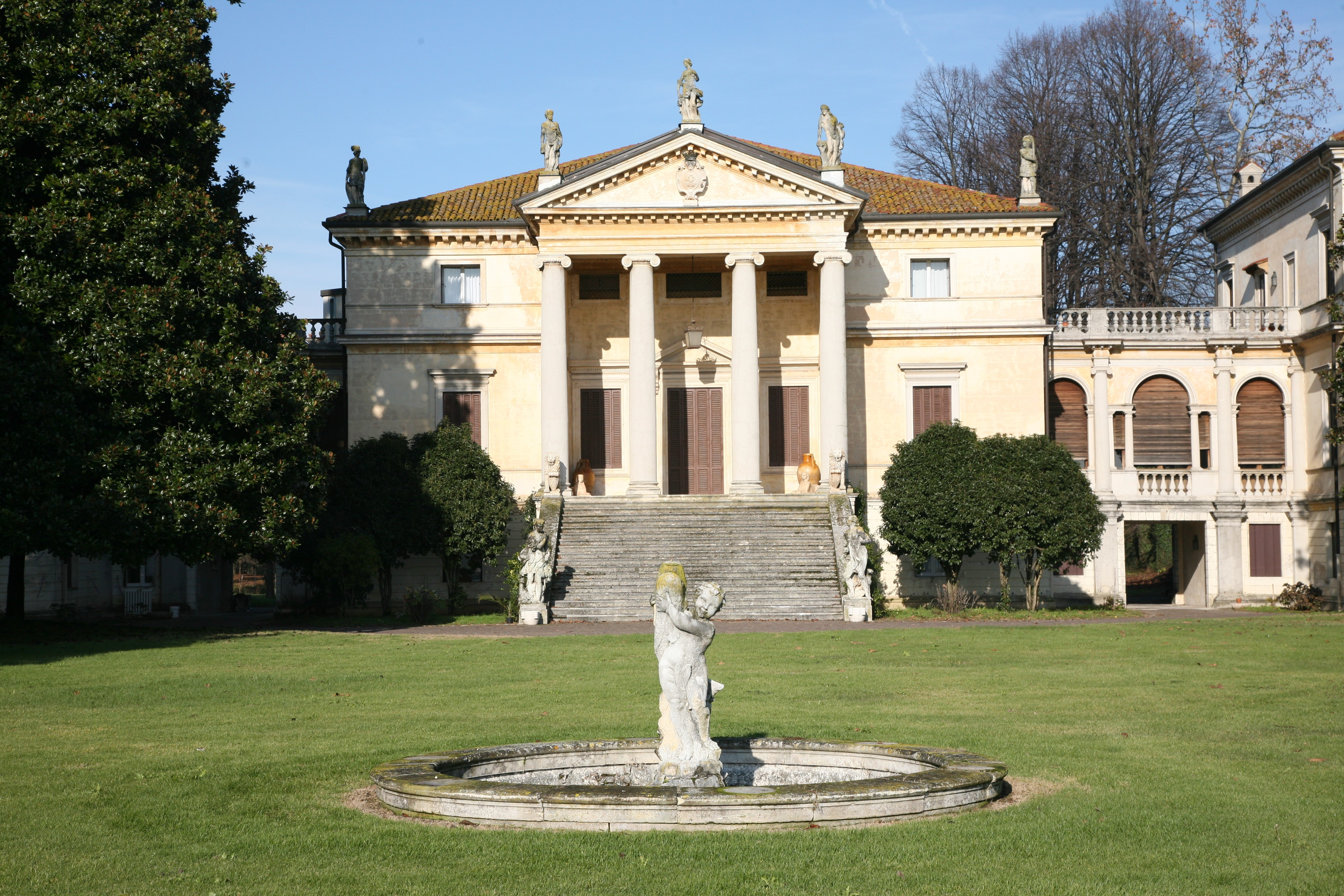
Villa Porto

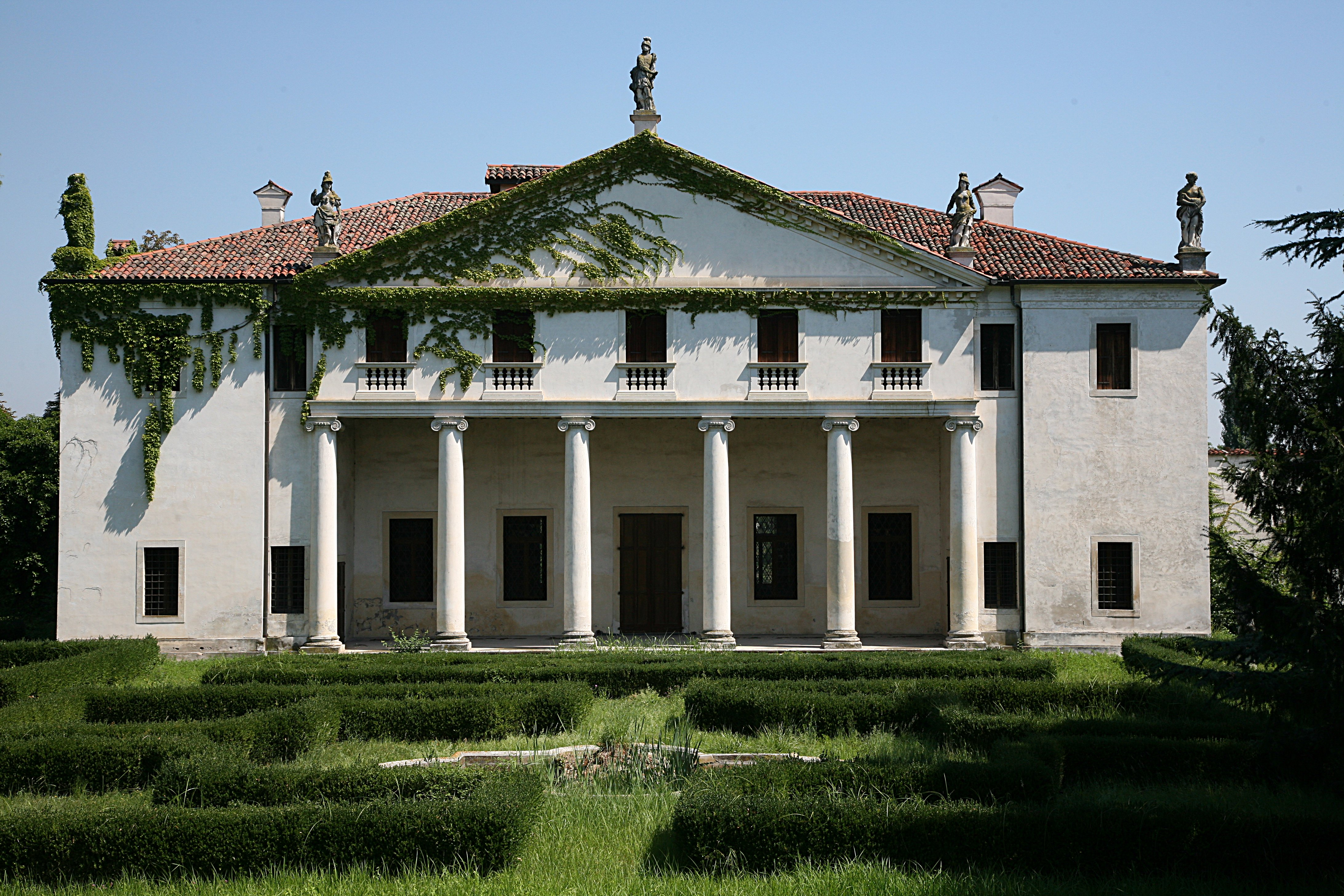
Villa Valmarana

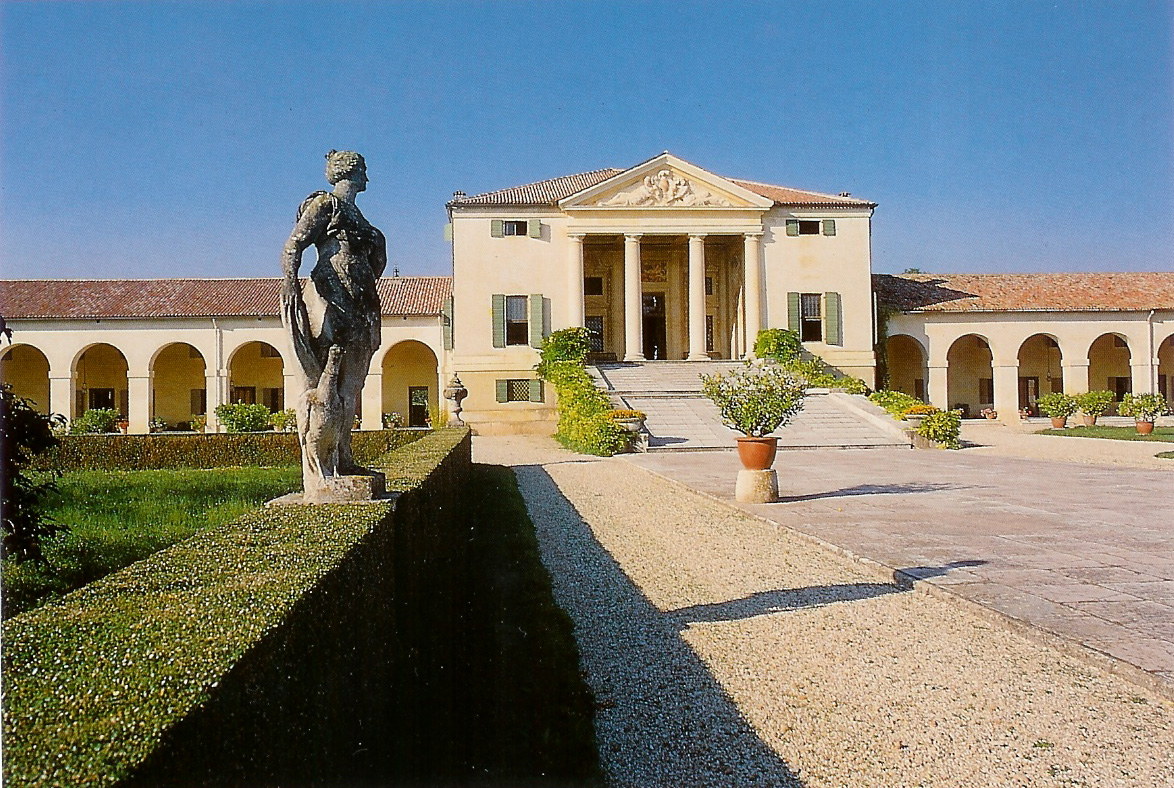
Villa Emo

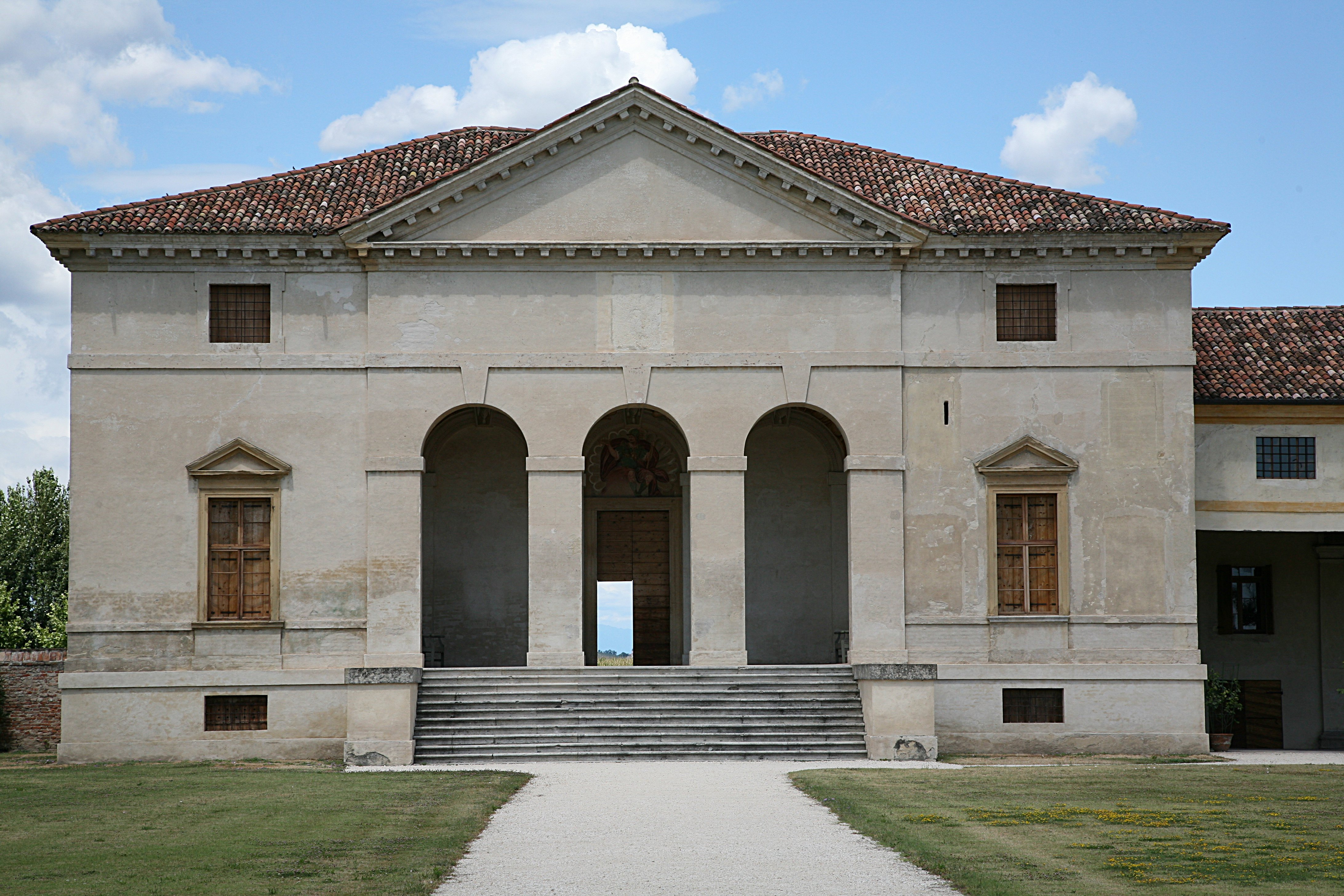
Villa Saraceno

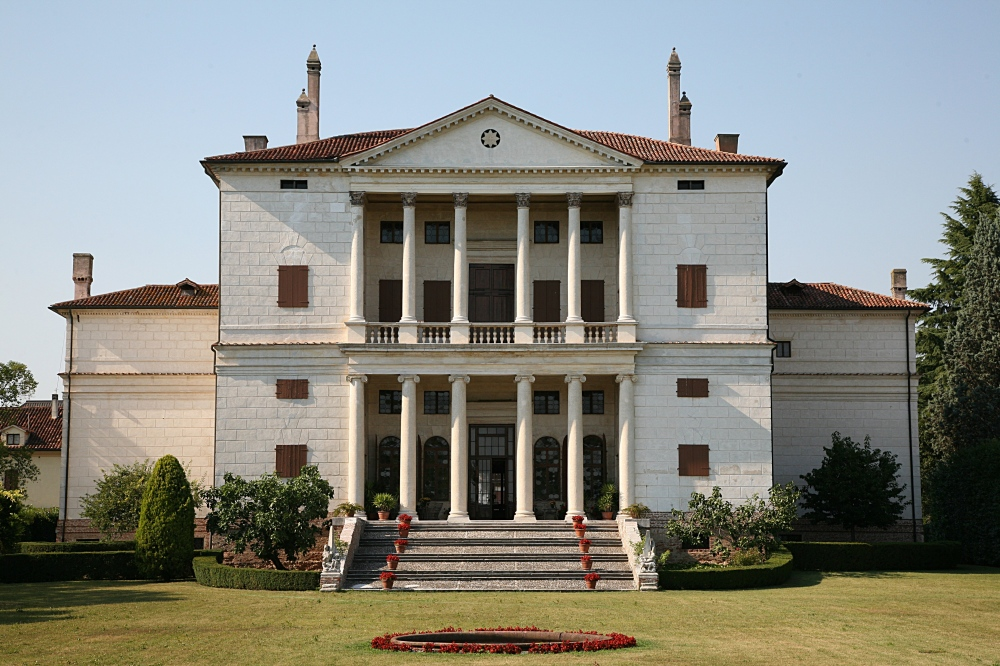
Villa Cornaro

=== Palaces ===
- 1540 (built 1540–1542): Palazzo Civena, for Giovanni Giacomo, Pier Antonio, Vincenzo and Francesco Civena, Vicenza (rebuilt in 1750 and after World War II)
- 1542 (built 1542–1558): Palazzo Thiene, for Marcantonio and Adriano Thiene, Vicenza (probably on a project by Giulio Romano)
- 1545: Palazzo Garzadori in contra' Piancoli, for Girolamo Garzadori, Vicenza (unbuilt, uncertain attribution)
- 1546–1549 (built 1549–1614): Loggias of the Palazzo della Ragione (then called Basilica Palladiana), Vicenza (completed in 1614 after Palladio's death)
- c. 1546 (built: 1546–1552): Palazzo Porto, for Iseppo da Porto, Vicenza
- 1548 (built 1548–1552): Palazzo Volpe in contra' Gazzolle, for Antonio Volpe, Vicenza (uncertain attribution)
- 1550 (built 1551–1557; c. 1680): Palazzo Chiericati, for Girolamo Chiericati, Vicenza (completed about 1680 after Palladio's death)
- c. 1555–c. 1566: Palazzo Pojana, for Vincenzo Pojana, Vicenza (attributed)
- c. 1555: Palazzo Dalla Torre, for Giambattista Dalla Torre, Verona (only partially realized; partially destroyed by a bombing in 1945)
- 1555 ?: Palazzo Poiana in contra' San Tomaso, for Bonifacio Pojana, Vicenza (unfinished)
- 1555–1556 ?: Palazzo Garzadori, for Giambattista Garzadori, Polegge, Vicenza (unbuilt project)
- c. 1556 (built 1556–1595): Palazzo Antonini, for Floriano Antonini, Udine (altered by later arrangements)
- After 1556: Loggia Valmarana in the Giardini Salvi, for Gian Luigi Valmarana, Vicenza (uncertain attribution)
- 1557–1558: Palazzo Trissino in contra' Riale, for Francesco and Ludovico Trissino, Vicenza (unbuilt project)
- 1559 (built 1559–1562): Casa Cogollo, for Pietro Cogollo, traditionally known as Casa del Palladio ("Palladio's home"), Vicenza (attributed)
- 1560 (built 1560–1565; 1574–1575): Palazzo Schio, for Bernardo Schio, Vicenza (façade)
- After 1561: Palazzo Della Torre ai Portoni della Bra', for Giambattista Della Torre, Verona (unbuilt project)
- 1564 (built 1565–1586): Palazzo Pretorio, for the town council, Cividale del Friuli, Province of Udine (project, attributed)
- 1564 ?: Palazzo Angaran, for Giacomo Angaran, Vicenza (unbuilt project)
- After 1564: Palazzo Capra al Corso, for Giulio Capra, Vicenza (unbuilt project)
- 1565 (built 1571–1572): Palazzo del Capitaniato (or Loggia del Capitanio), for the town council, Vicenza
- 1565 (built 1566–1580): Palazzo Valmarana, for Isabella Nogarola Valmarana, Vicenza
- 1569 (built 1570–1575): Palazzo Barbaran da Porto, for Montano Barbarano, Vicenza
- 1571 ? (built 1572–1585): Palazzo Porto in Piazza Castello, for Alessandro Porto, Vicenza (unfinished; partially completed in 1615 by Vincenzo Scamozzi)
- 1572 ? (built before 1586–1610s): Palazzo Thiene Bonin Longare, for Francesco Thiene, Vicenza (progetto; costruito da Vincenzo Scamozzi)
- 1574: Rooms of Palazzo Ducale, Venice
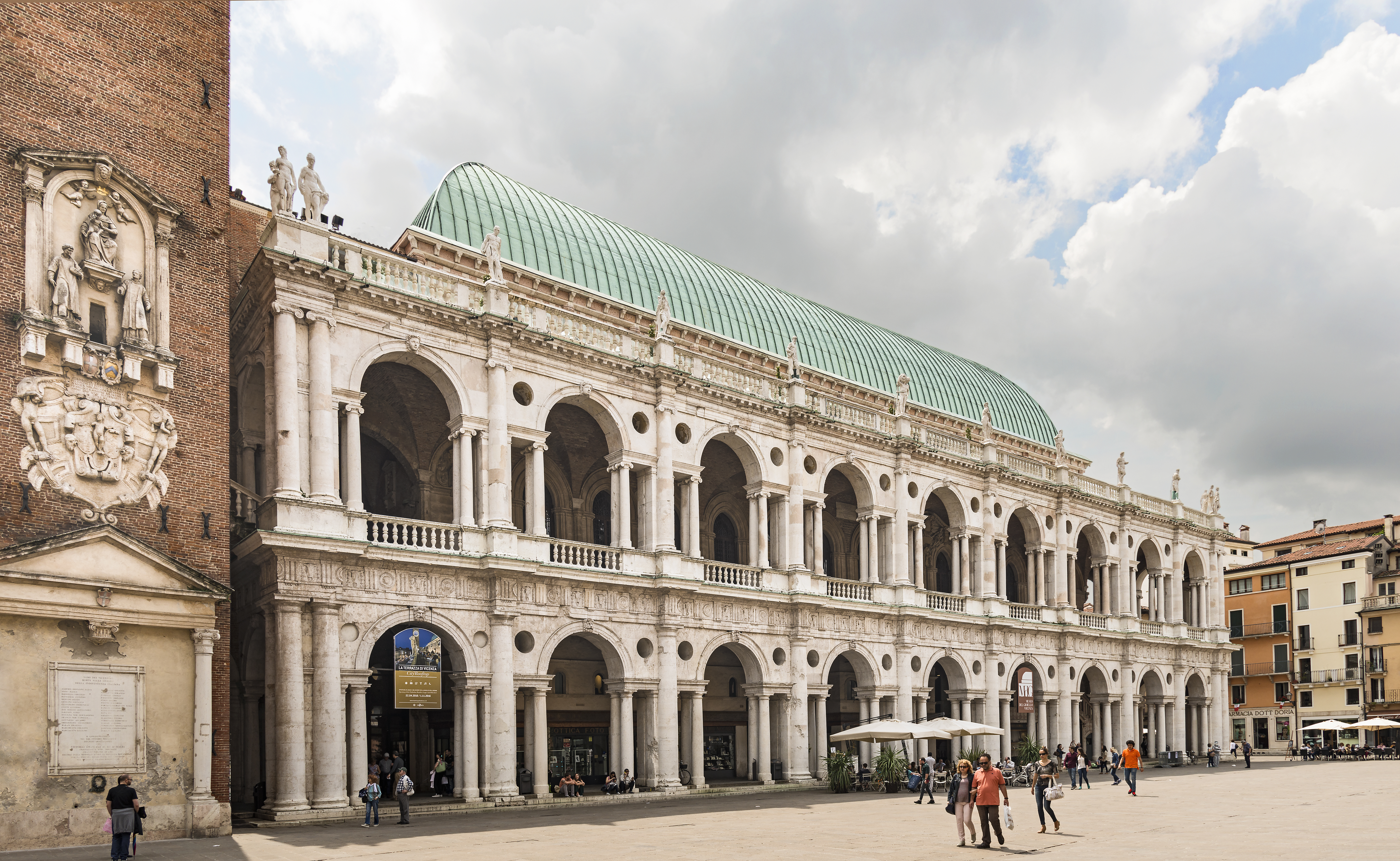
Basilica Palladiana, Vicenza

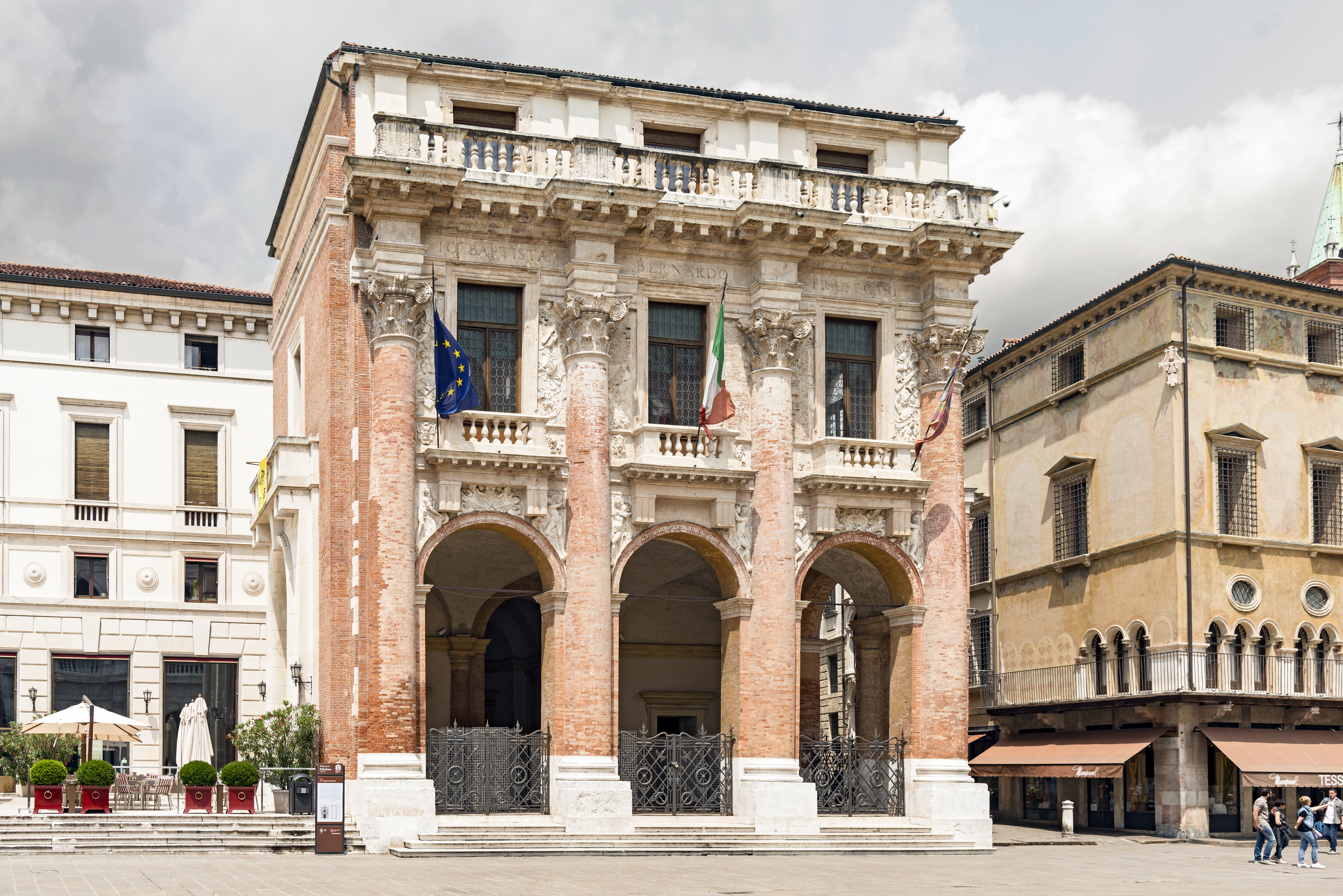
Palazzo del Capitaniato, Vicenza

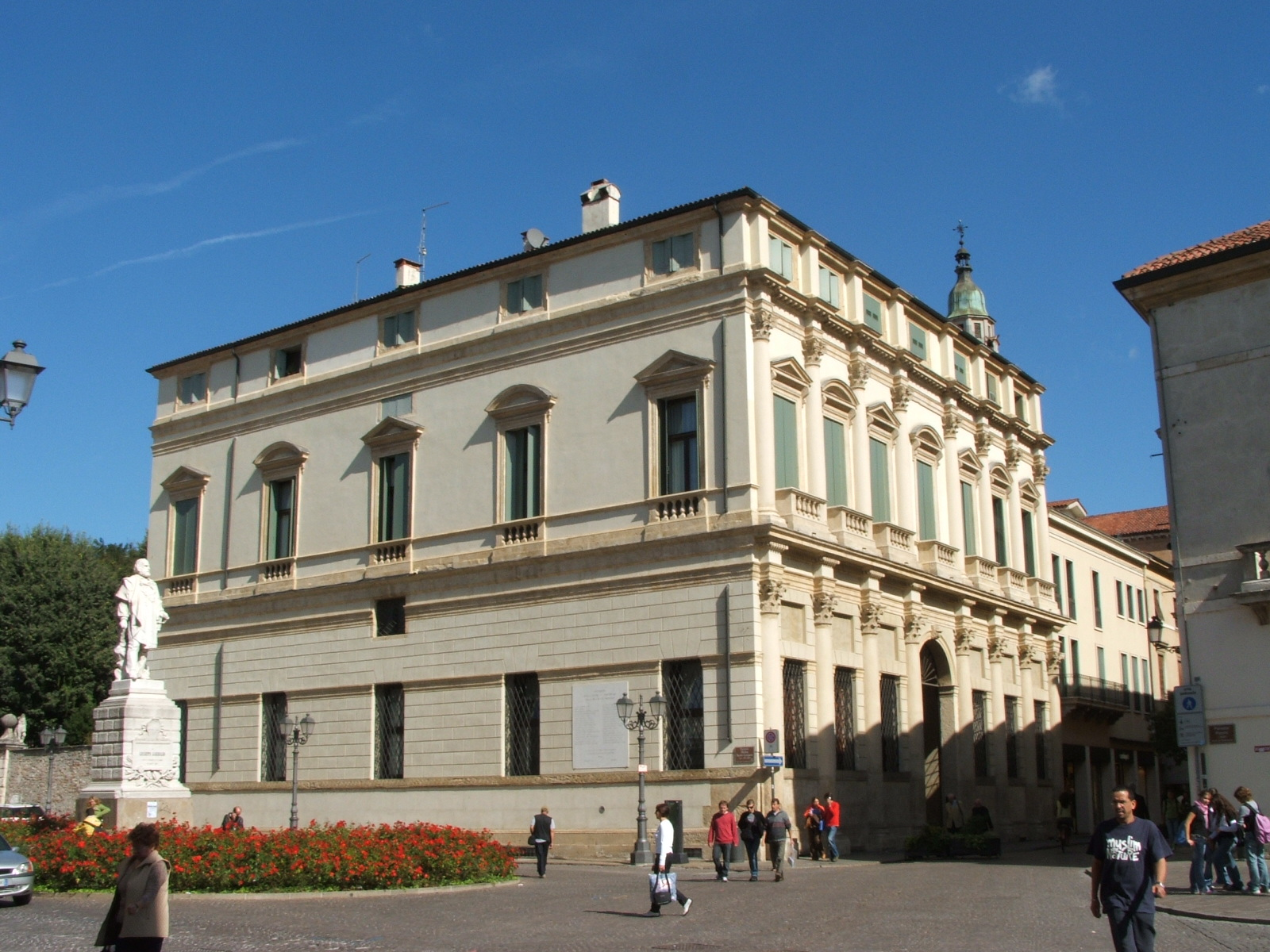
Palazzo Thiene Bonin Longare, Vicenza

=== Church architecture ===
- 1531: Portal for the church of Santa Maria dei Servi, Vicenza (attributed; with Girolamo Pittoni and Giacomo da Porlezza)
- 1537: Monument to Girolamo Schio, Bishop of Vaison in the Cathedral of Vicenza (with Girolamo Pittoni, attributed)
- 1558 (built 1558–1559; 1564–1566): Dome of the Cathedral, Vicenza (destroyed in a bombing during World War II, then rebuilt)
- 1559: Façade for the Basilica of San Pietro di Castello, Venice (completed after Palladio's death)
- 1560 (built 1560–1563): Refectory of the monastery of San Giorgio Maggiore, Venezia
- 1560 (built 1561–1562): Convento della Carità, Venice (only the cloister and the atrium destroyed in 1630 in a fire)
- 1560: Monument to Giano Fregoso in the church of Santa Anastasia of the Dominicans, for Ercole Fregoso, Verona (uncertain attribution; with Danese Cattaneo)
- After 1563: Funeral monument to Luigi Visconti in the cloister of the Chapter in the Basilica of Saint Anthony, Padua (attributed)
- 1564 (built 1564–1565): North portal and Almerico Chapel in the Vicenza Cathedral, for Paolo Almerico, Vicenza
- 1564: Façade for the church of San Francesco della Vigna, for Giovanni Grimani, Venice
- 1565 (built 1565–1576): Church of San Giorgio Maggiore, for the Congregation of Santa Giustina, Venice (completed between 1607 and 1611, after Palladio's death, with a different façade, by Vincenzo Scamozzi)
- 1574: Façade for San Petronio Basilica, Bologna (studies)
- 1574 or 1579 ?: Church of Le Zitelle, Venice (uncertain attribution)
- c. 1576 (built 1576–1580): Valmarana Chapel in the Church of Santa Corona, for Isabella Nogarola Valmarana, Vicenza
- 1576 (built 1577–1586): Church of Il Redentore, Venice
- 1578 (built 1588–1590): Church of Santa Maria Nova, Vicenza (project attributed, completed after Palladio's death)
- 1580: Church of Santa Lucia, Venice (drawings for the interior; demolished)
- 1580 (built 1580–1584): Church of Villa Barbaro (Tempietto Barbaro), for Marcantonio Barbaro, Maser, Province of Treviso
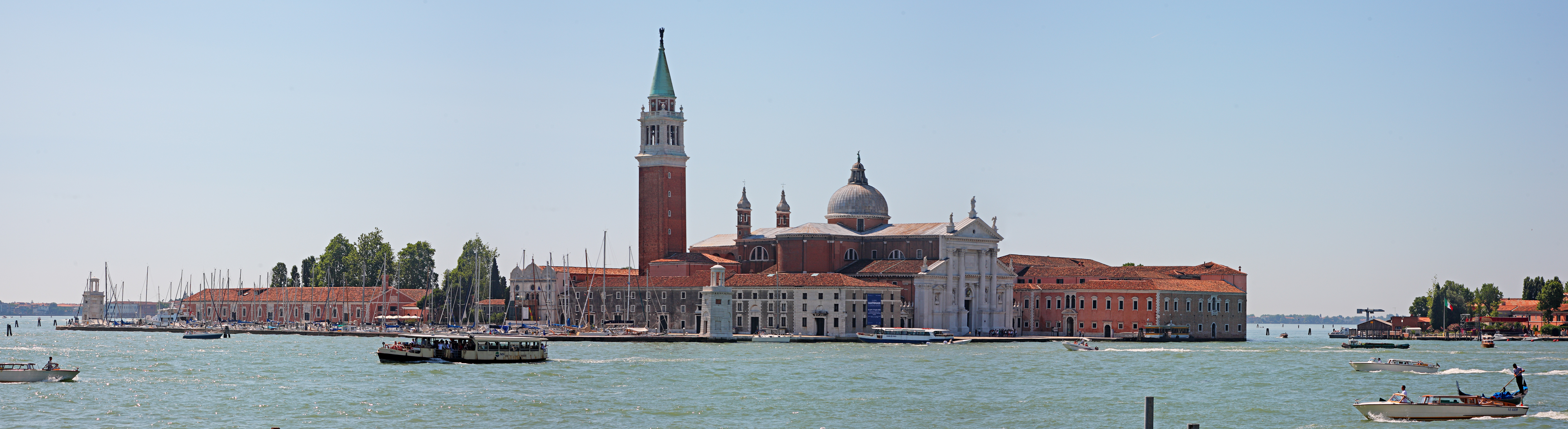
Panorama of San Giorgio Maggiore viewed from the main island of Venice

=== Other ===
- 1536: Portal of the Domus Comestabilis, Vicenza (attributed)
- 1550 (built 1550–1552): Bridge on Cismon, Cismon del Grappa, Province of Vicenza (destroyed)
- 1556: Arco Bollani (an arch over the road leading to the Udine Castle), for Domenico Bollani, Udine (attributed)
- 1561: Wooden theater in the Basilica for the play L'Amor Costante by Alessandro Piccolomini, for the Accademia Olimpica, Vicenza
- 1562: Wooden theater in the Basilica for the play Sofonisba by Giangiorgio Trissino, for the Accademia Olimpica, Vicenza
- 1566: Rialto Bridge (Ponte di Rialto), Venice (unbuilt project)
- 1567; 1569: Ponte Vecchio, Bassano del Grappa, Province of Vicenza (rebuilt in 1748 and after World War II)
- 1569 or 1580? (built 1580–1588): Bridge on Tesina, Torri di Quartesolo, Province of Vicenza (attributed)
- 1576 (built 1595): Arco delle Scalette, for Giacomo Bragadino, Vicenza (attributed, built after Palladio's death)
- 1578: Jewel of Vicenza, for the city as an ex-voto, Vicenza (uncertain attribution)
- 1579: Porta Gemona, for the town council, San Daniele del Friuli, Province of Udine
- 1580 (built 1580–1584): Teatro Olimpico, for the Accademia Olimpica, Vicenza (completed after Palladio's death by Vincenzo Scamozzi)

== See also ==
- Palladian architecture
- Palladian villas of the Veneto
- Palladio (orchestral piece)

== Notes and references ==
=== Bibliography ===
- Ducher, Robert (1988). Caractéristique des Styles. Paris: Flammarion. ISBN 2-08-011539-1.
- Hart, Vaughan, Hicks, Peter (2006), Palladio’s Rome. Translation of Andrea Palladio’s L’Antichita di Roma and Descritione de le chiese…in la città de Roma, (1554) including as an appendix Raphael’s famous Letter to Leo X, Yale University Press, London and New Haven, ISBN 0-300-10909-1.
- Oudin, Bernard (1994). Dictionnaire des Architects (in French). Paris: Seghiers. ISBN 978-2-2321-0398-8.
- Palladio, Andrea (1965) [1570]. The Four Books of Architecture. intro. by Adolf K. Placzek. New York: Dover Publications. ISBN 0-486-21308-0.
- Wundram, Manfred (2009). Andrea Palladio, 1508–1580: the rules of harmony. Hong Kong: Taschen. ISBN 9783836502894.
- Wundram, Manfred (2016). Andrea Palladio – Les règles de l'harmonie (in French). Cologne: Taschen. ISBN 978-3-8365-5020-8.
