= Villa Saraceno =

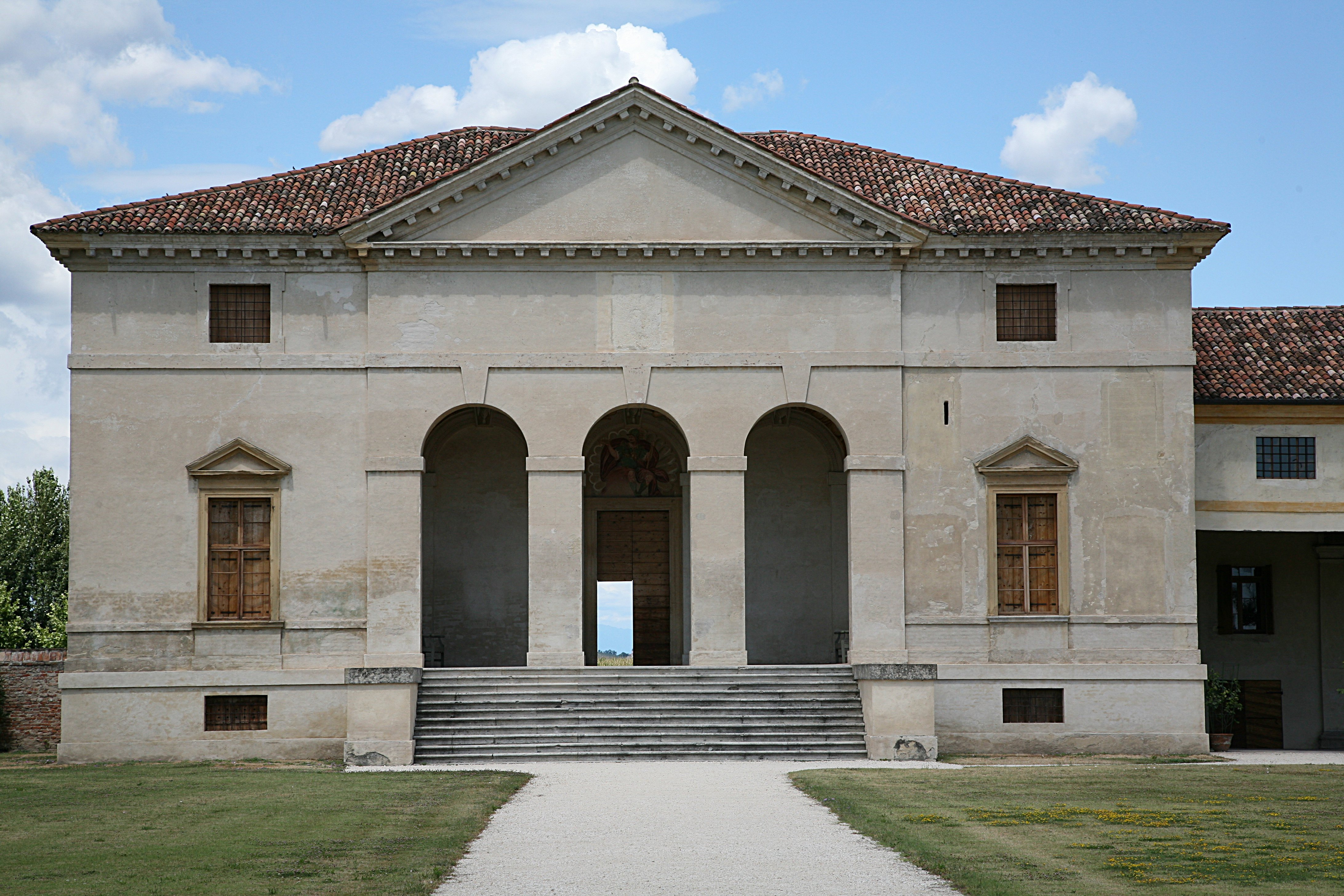
- Front elevation
- Interactive map of the Villa Saraceno area

General information
- Type: Villa
- Architectural style: Palladian
- Location: Agugliaro, Italy
- Coordinates: 45°18′45″N 11°33′59″E
- Construction started: 1540s
- Completed: 1540s
- Renovated: 1994
- Client: Biagio Saraceno
- Owner: Landmark Trust (United Kingdom)

Technical details
- Structural system: brick and wood; limited use of stone

Design and construction
- Architect: Andrea Palladio

UNESCO World Heritage Site
- Part of: City of Vicenza and the Palladian Villas of the Veneto
- Criteria: Cultural: (i), (ii)
- Reference: 712bis-012
- Inscription: 1994 (18th Session)
- Extensions: 1996
- Area: 0.59 ha (1.5 acres)

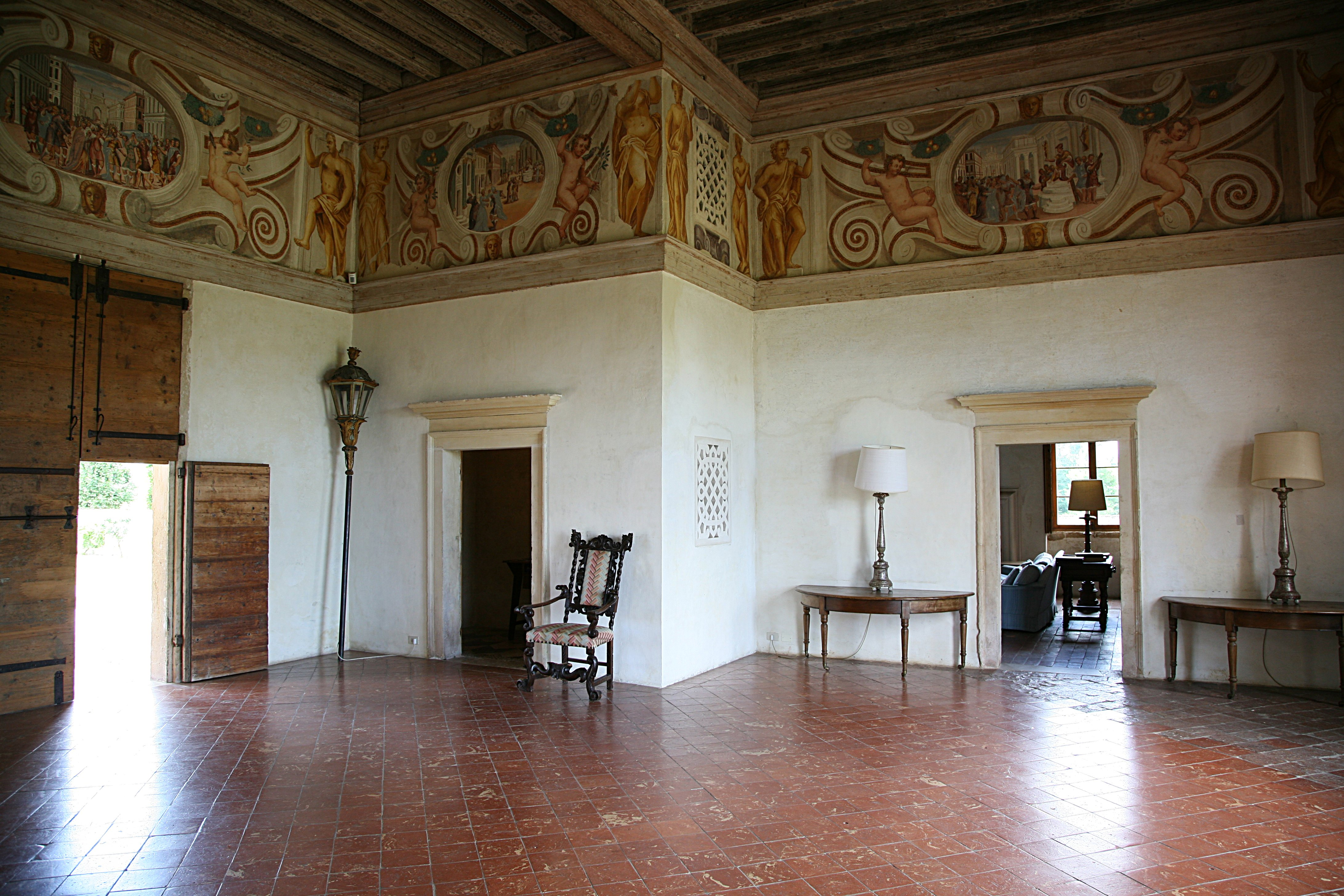
The Sala, 2007

Villa Saraceno is a Palladian Villa in Agugliaro, Province of Vicenza, northern Italy. It was commissioned by the patrician Saraceno family.

== History ==
Villa Saraceno has been dated to the 1540s, which makes it one of Andrea Palladio's earlier works. In 1570, the building was illustrated in an imagined state in its architect's influential book I quattro libri dell'architettura.

However, the villa had been constructed in a more modest form, and existing farm buildings were retained rather than being replaced by the architect's "trade-mark" wings. The reasons for the divergence between the published plan and the actual building are not entirely clear, but it is not the only one of Palladio's villas to be different from the published plan. The incomplete Villa Trissino (Meledo di Sarego) is another example.

== Architecture ==
Villa Saraceno is one of Palladio's simpler creations. Like most of Palladio's villas it combines living space for its upper-class owners with space for uses related to agriculture. Above the piano nobile is a floor which was designed as a granary.

As it stands today, the villa has a nineteenth-century wing which links it to a fifteenth-century building.

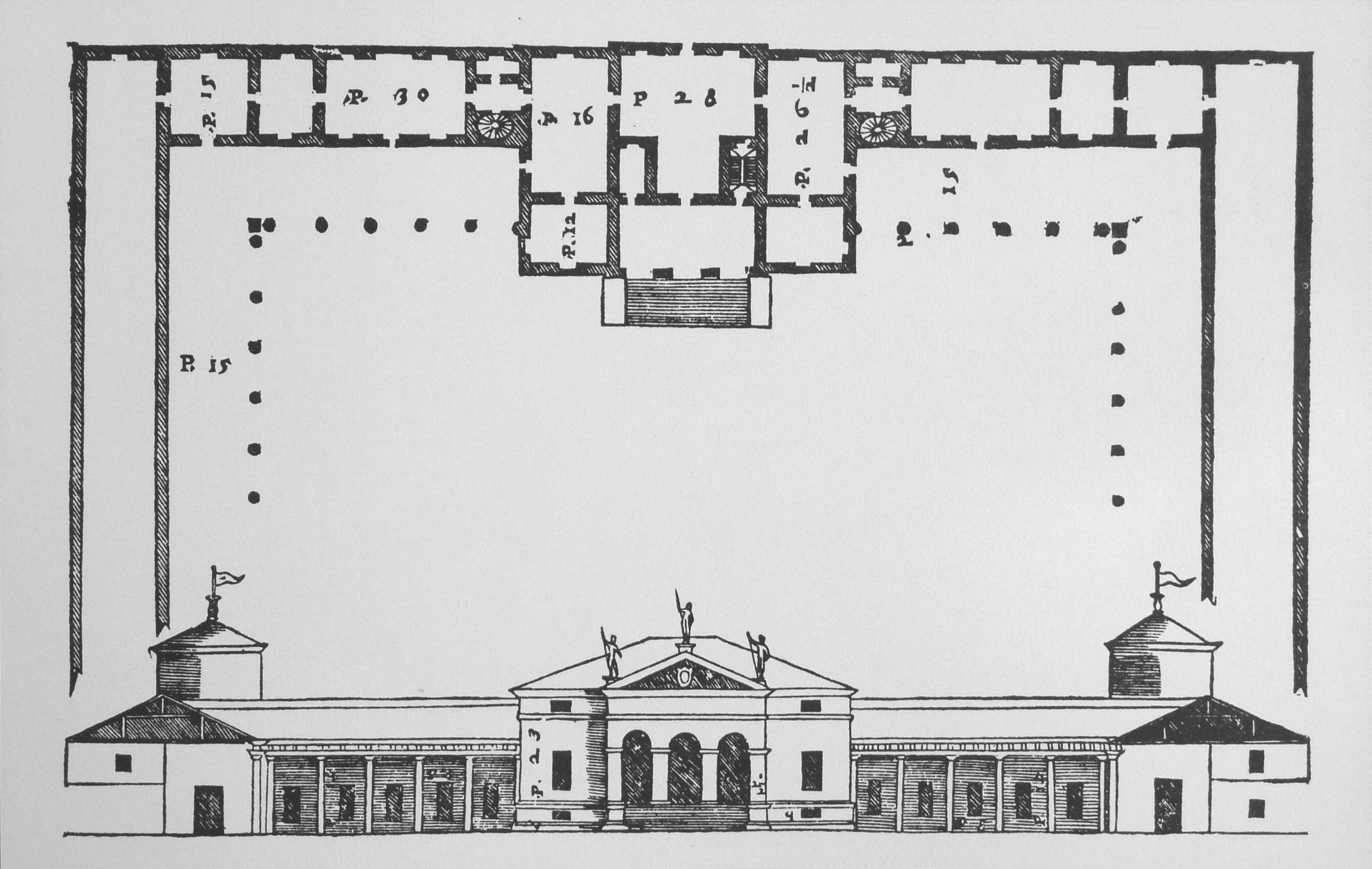
Floor plan from I quattro libri dell'architettura

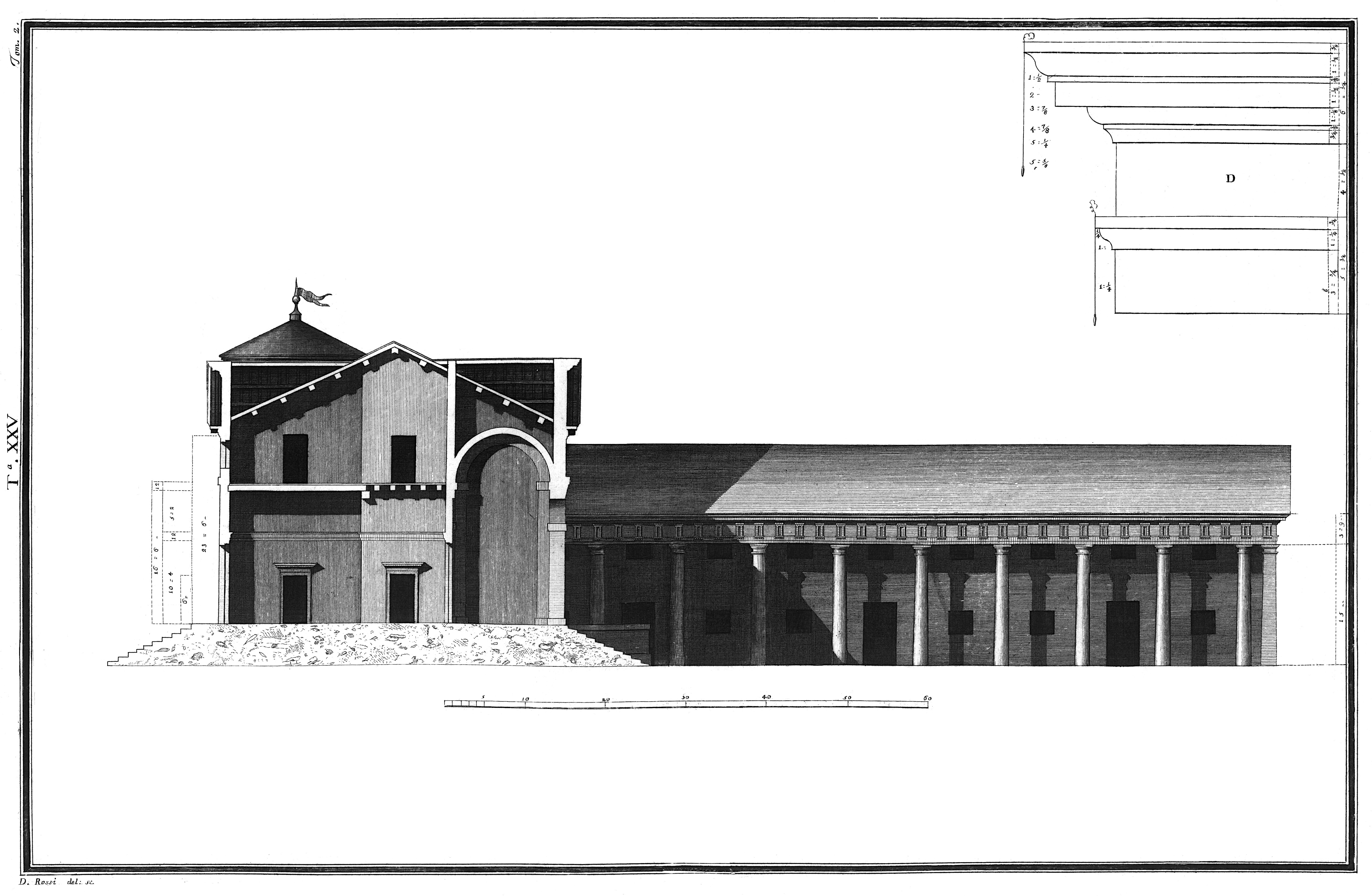
Cross section (drawing by Ottavio Bertotti Scamozzi, 1778)

== Restoration and current use of the villa ==
The villa fell into a poor state of repair in the twentieth century but retained some of its original frescoes. It was acquired in 1989 by the British charity the Landmark Trust. By 1994 the Trust had completed its restoration, converting the property, which includes adjacent farm-buildings not by Palladio, into a holiday home sleeping up to 16 people. The many people who have since stayed in the villa include Witold Rybczynski, who used it as a base when researching his book on Palladio.

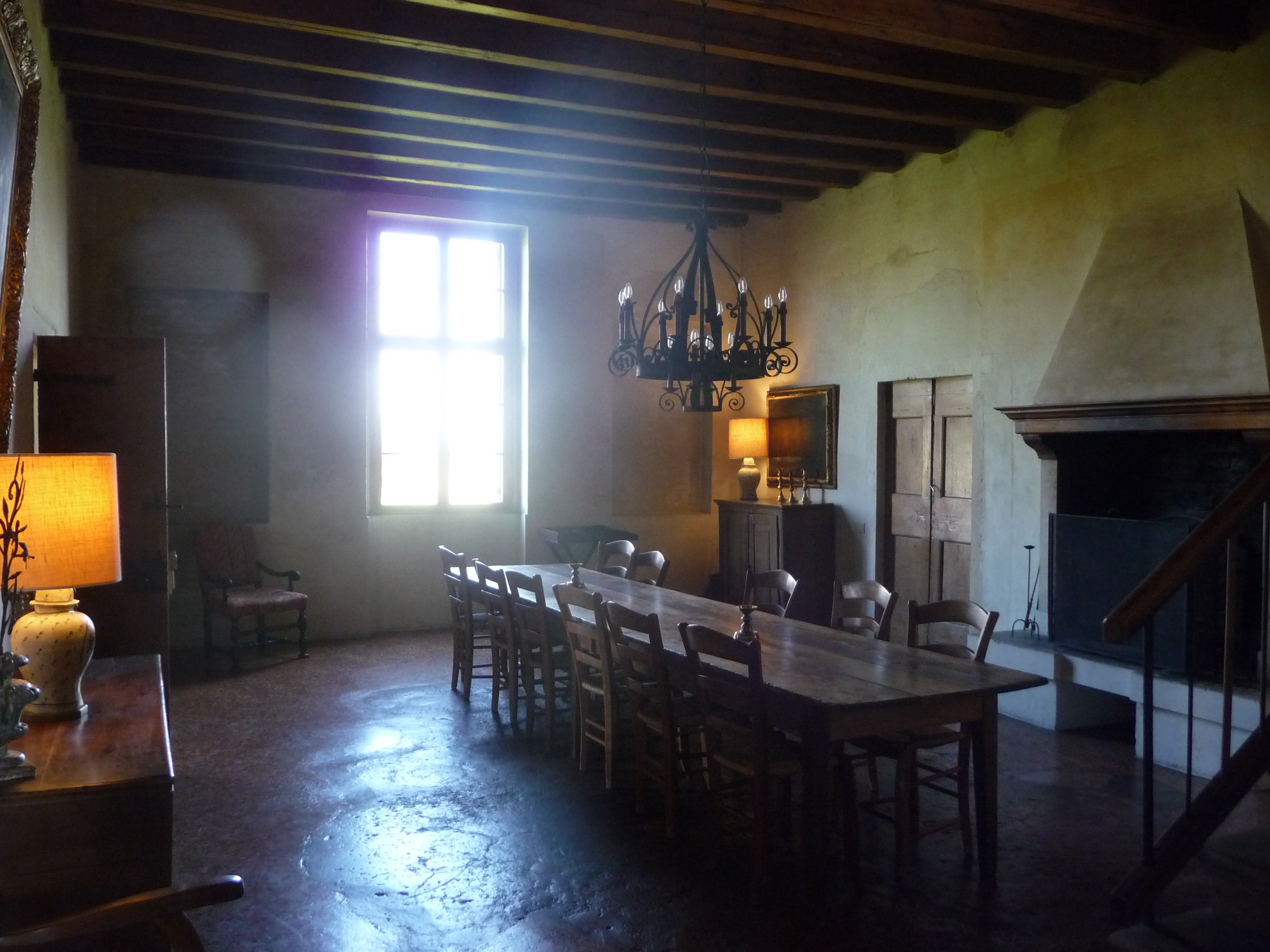
Dining room, 2017

The restoration has been praised for its sensitivity, and since 1996 the villa has enjoyed an additional level of protection, being conserved as one of the buildings which make up the World Heritage Site "City of Vicenza and the Palladian Villas of the Veneto". The principal rooms of the villa are open to the public on a limited basis, but the Trust attracted some criticism in the past for not promoting the building as part of the World Heritage Site. In 2008, the Landmark Trust celebrated the 500th anniversary of Palladio's birth with a new guidebook for the Villa Saraceno in English and Italian and extended opportunities for visiting.

== See also ==
- Palladian Villas of Veneto
- Palladian architecture
