= Palazzo Pisani =

Palazzo Pisani may refer to one of the follow Venetian palazzos:

- Palazzo Pisani Gritti, 14th-century palace along the Grand Canal across from Santa Maria della Salute in the San Marco sestiere
- Palazzo Pisani Moretta, 15th-century palace along the Grand Canal in the San Polo sestiere
- Palazzo Pisani a San Stefano, 17th-century palace on Campo Santo Stefano in the San Marco sestiere, city-owned and home to the Conservatorio di Musica Benedetto Marcello di Venezia
