= Palladian villas of the Veneto =

Villas in north-eastern Italy

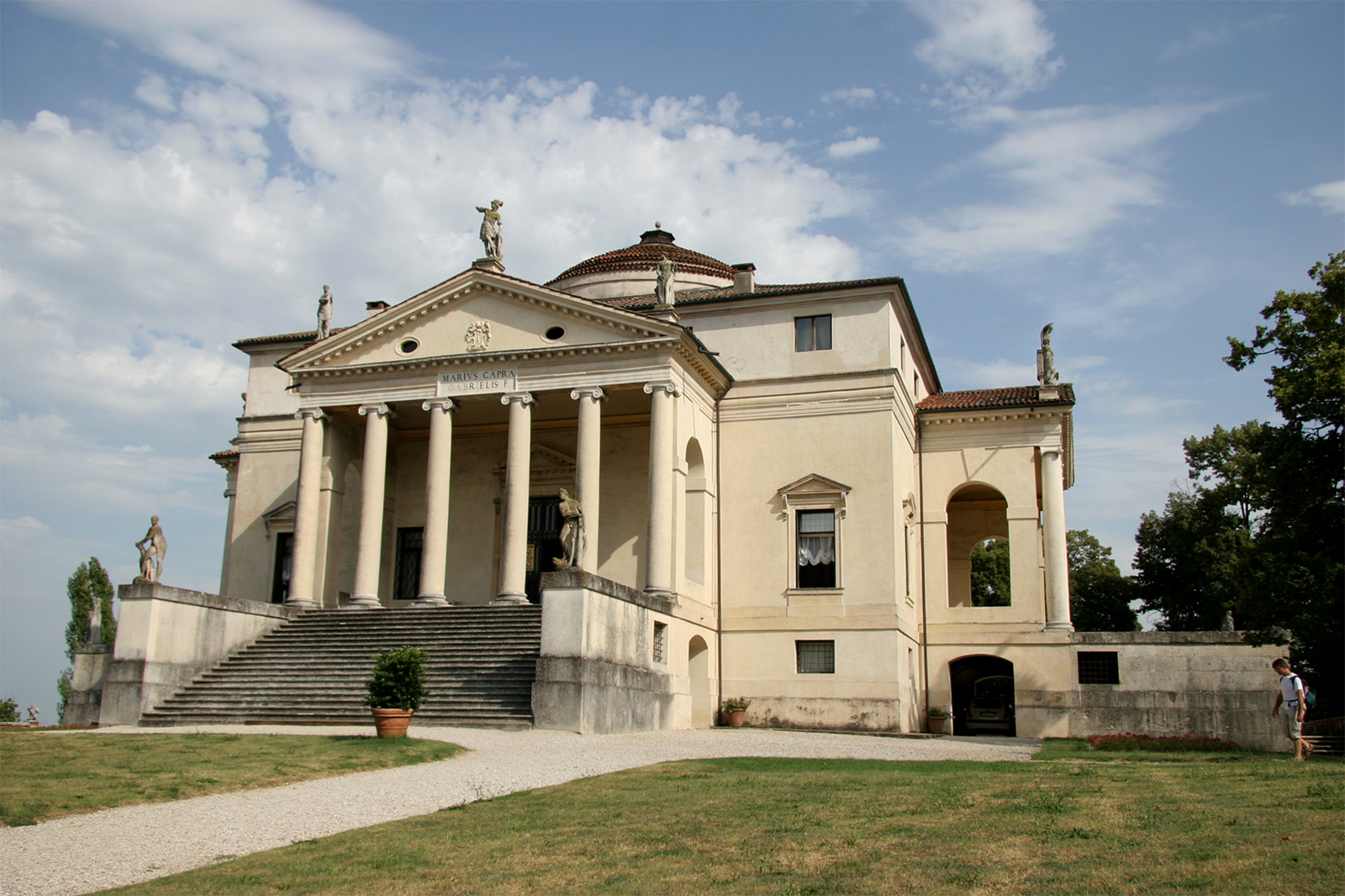
Villa Capra "La Rotonda" in Vicenza. One of Palladio's most influential designs.

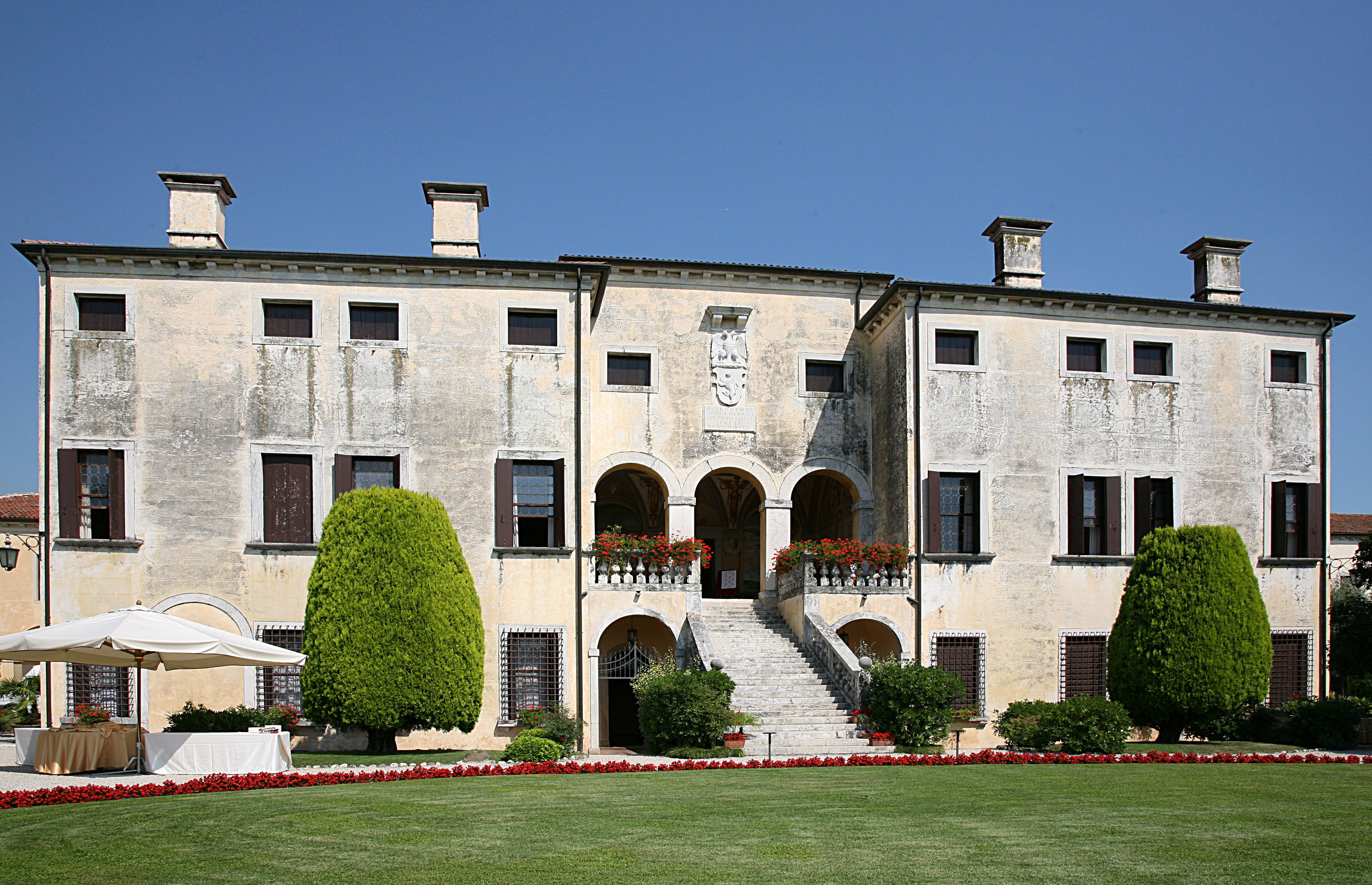
Villa Godi in Lugo Vicentino. An early work notable for lack of external decoration.

The Palladian villas of the Veneto are villas designed by Renaissance architect Andrea Palladio, all of whose buildings were erected in the Veneto, the mainland region of north-eastern Italy then under the political control of the Venetian Republic. Most villas are listed by UNESCO as part of a World Heritage Site named City of Vicenza and the Palladian Villas of the Veneto.

The term villa was used to describe a country house. Often rich families in the Veneto also had a house in town called palazzo. In most cases the owners named their palazzi and ville with the family surname, hence there is both a Palazzo Chiericati in Vicenza and a Villa Chiericati in the countryside, similarly there is a Ca' Foscari in Venice and a Villa Foscari in the countryside. Somewhat confusingly, there are multiple Villa Pisani, including two by Palladio.

UNESCO inscribed the site on the World Heritage List in 1994. At first the site was called "Vicenza, City of Palladio" and only buildings in the immediate area of Vicenza were included. Various types of buildings were represented in the original site, which included the Teatro Olimpico, some palazzi and a few villas. Because most of Palladio's surviving villas lay outside the site, in 1996 the site was expanded, hence the newer name "City of Vicenza and the Palladian Villas of the Veneto". This name reflects the fact that it includes villas designed by Palladio throughout the Veneto.

== Villa architecture ==
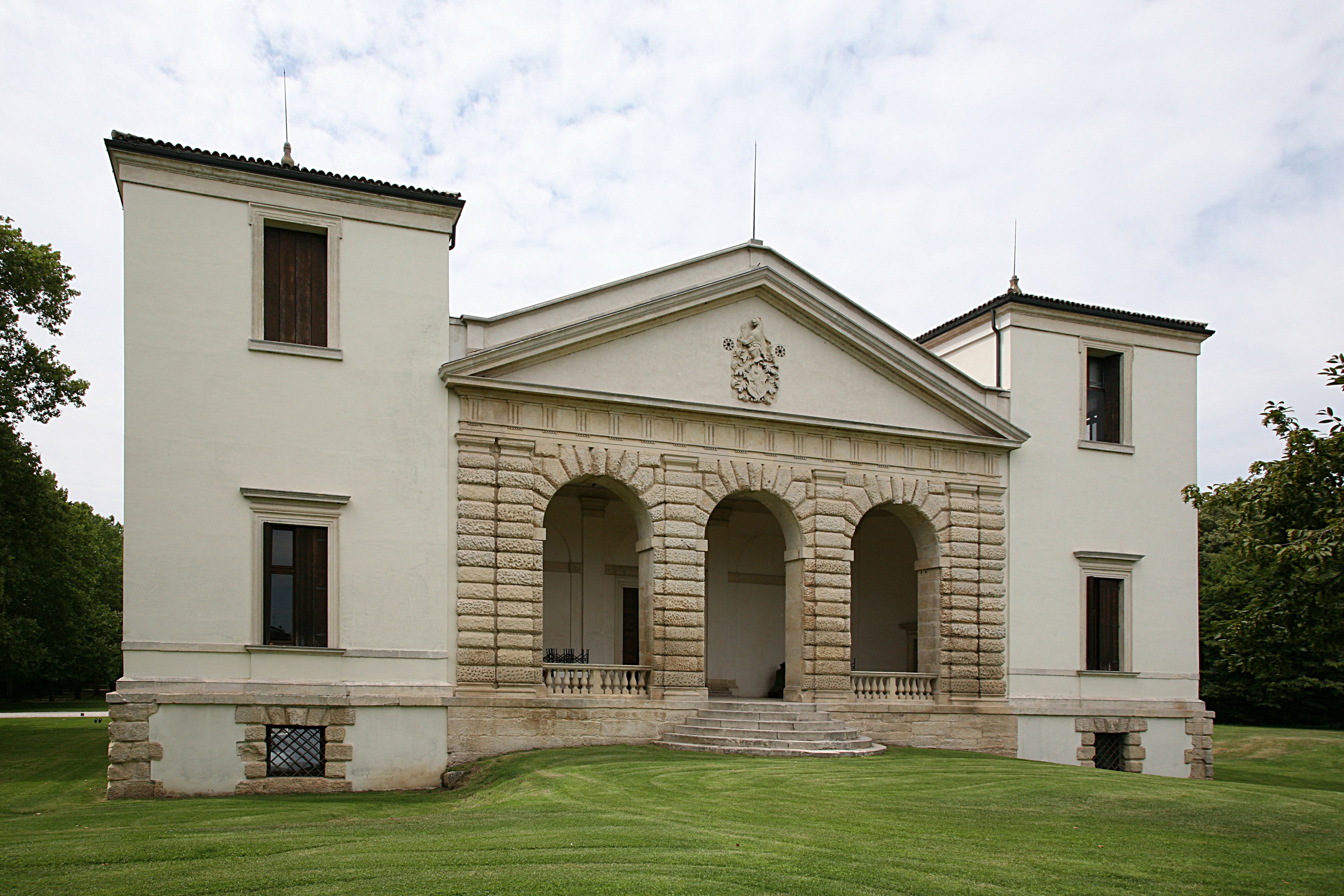
Villa Pisani, Bagnolo di Lonigo

By 1550, Palladio had produced a group of villas, whose scale and decoration can be seen as closely matching the wealth and social standing of the owners: the powerful and very rich Pisani family, bankers and Venetian patricians, had huge vaults and a loggia façade realised with stone piers and rusticated Doric pilasters; in his villa at Bertesina, the (briefly) wealthy minor noble and salt-tax farmer Taddeo Gazzotti had pilasters executed in brick, though the capitals and bases were carved in stone; Biagio Saraceno at Villa Saraceno had a loggia with three arched bays, but without any architectural order. In the Villa Saraceno as in the Villa Pojana, Palladio gave presence and dignity to an exterior simply by the placing and orchestration of windows, pediments, and loggia arcades. His less wealthy patrons must have appreciated the possibility of being able to enjoy impressive buildings without having to spend much on stone and stone carving.

Palladio's reputation initially, and after his death, has been founded on his skill as a designer of villas. Considerable damage had been done to houses, barns, and rural infrastructures during the War of the League of Cambrai (1509–1517). Recovery of former levels of prosperity in the countryside was probably slow, and it was only in the 1540s, with the growth of the urban market for foodstuffs and determination at government level to free Venice and the Veneto from dependence on imported grain, above all grain coming from the always threatening Ottoman Empire, that a massive investment in agriculture and the structures necessary for agricultural production gathers pace. Landowners for decades had been steadily under stable Venetian rule, been buying up small holdings, and consolidating their estates not only by purchase, but by swaps of substantial properties with the other landowners. Investment in irrigation and land reclamation through drainage further increased the income of wealthy landowners.

Palladio's villas (that is, the houses of estate owners) met a need for a new type of country residence. His designs implicitly recognise that it was not necessary to have a great palace in the countryside, modeled directly on city palaces, as many late fifteenth-century villas (like the huge Palazzo Porto Colleoni Thiene, also called a "Villa") in fact are. Something smaller, often with only one main living floor was adequate as a centre for controlling the productive activity from which much of the owner's income probably derived and for impressing tenants and neighbours as well as entertaining important guests.

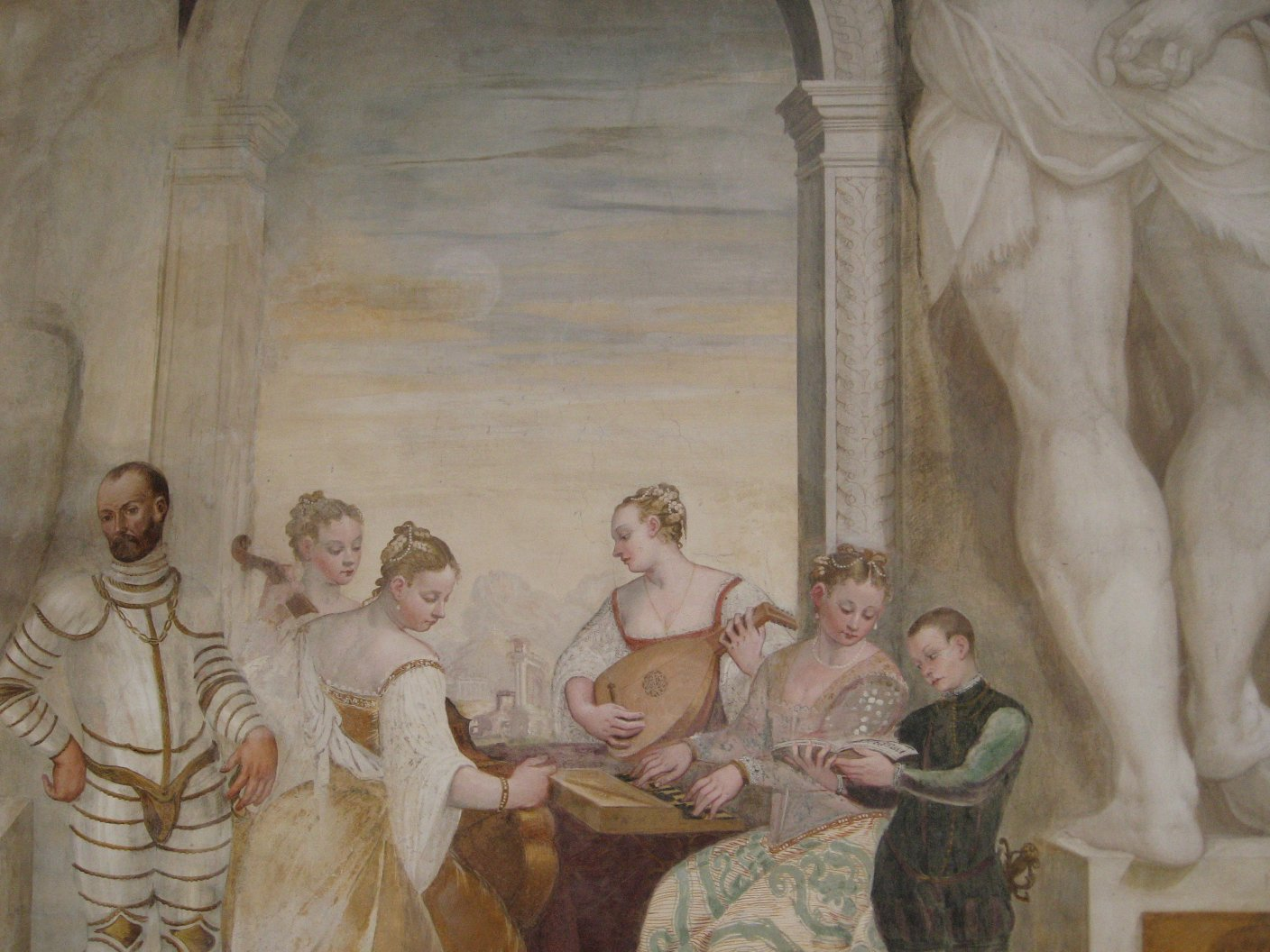
The frescoes in the Villa Caldogno main hall depict the different moments of the life in villa at Palladio's age

These residences, though sometimes smaller than earlier villas, were just as effective for establishing a social and political presence in the countryside, and for relaxing, hunting, and getting away from the city, which was always potentially unhealthy. Façades, dominated by pediments usually decorated with the owner's coat of arms, advertised a powerful presence across a largely flat territory, and to be seen did not need to be as high as the owner's city palace. Their loggie offered a pleasant place to eat, or talk, or perform music in the shade, activities which one can see celebrated in villa decoration, for instance in the Villa Caldogno. In their interior, Palladio distributed functions both vertically and horizontally. Kitchens, store-rooms, laundries and cellars were in the low ground floor; the ample space under the roof was used to store the most valuable product of the estate, grain, which incidentally also served to insulate the living rooms below. On the main living floor, used by family and their guests, the more public rooms (loggia, sala) were on the central axis, while left and right were symmetrical suites of rooms, going from large rectangular chambers, via square middling sized rooms, to small rectangular ones, sometimes used by the owner as studies or offices for administering the estate.

The owner's house was often not the only building for which Palladio was responsible. Villas, despite their unfortified appearance and their open loggie were still direct descendants of castles, and were surrounded by a walled enclosure, which gave them some necessary protection from bandits and marauders. The enclosure (cortivo) contained barns, dovecote towers, bread ovens, chicken sheds, stables, accommodation for factors and domestic servants, places to make cheese, press grapes, etc.

Already in the 15th century it was usual to create a court with a well in front of the house, separated from the farmyard with its barns, animals, and threshing-floor. Gardens, vegetable and herb gardens, fish ponds, and almost invariably a large orchard (brolo) all were clustered around, or located inside the main courtyard.

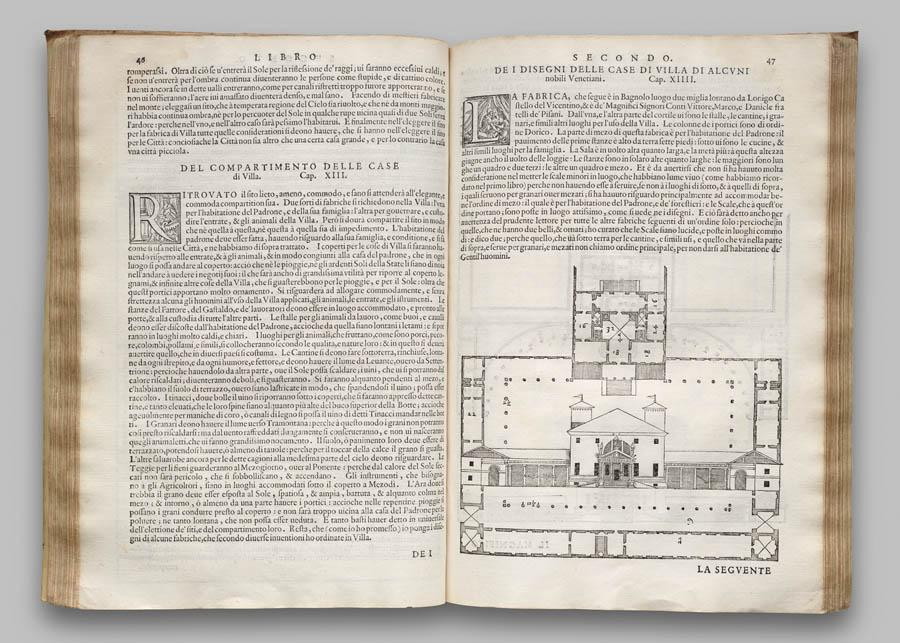
Villa Pisani in Bagnolo in the I quattro libri dell'architettura by Palladio (book II)

Palladio in his designs sought to co-ordinate all these varied elements, which in earlier complexes had usually found their place not on the basis of considerations of symmetry, vista, and architectural hierarchy, but of the shape of the available area, usually defined by roads and water courses. Orientation was also important: Palladio states in I quattro libri dell'architettura that barns should face south so as to keep the hay dry, thus preventing it from fermenting and burning.

Palladio found inspiration in large antique complexes which either resembled country houses surrounded by their outbuildings or which he actually considered residential layouts – an example is the temple of Hercules Victor at Tivoli, which he had surveyed. It is clear, for instance, that the curving barns which flank the majestic façade of the Villa Badoer were suggested by what was visible of the Forum of Augustus. In his book, Palladio usually shows villa layouts as symmetrical: he would have known however that often, unless the barns to the left and right of the house faced south, as at the Villa Barbaro at Maser, the complex would not have been built symmetrically. An example is the Villa Pojana, where the large barn, with fine Doric capitals, was certainly designed by Palladio. It faces south, and is not balanced by a similar element on the other side of the house.

== List ==
The World Heritage site includes the following villas:

#	Name	Location	Province	Coordinates	
712-001 (23 site)	City of Vicenza including 23 buildings by Palladio	Vicenza	Vicenza		45°32′57″N 11°32′58″E
712-002	Villa Trissino	Vicenza	Vicenza		45°33′55″N 11°32′49″E
712-003	Villa Gazzotti Grimani	Vicenza	Vicenza		45°33′13″N 11°34′30″E
712-004	Villa Almerico Capra, «La Rotonda»	Vicenza	Vicenza		45°31′54″N 11°33′36″E
712-005	Villa Angarano	Bassano del Grappa	Vicenza		45°46′50″N 11°43′25″E
712-006	Villa Caldogno	Caldogno	Vicenza		45°36′26″N 11°30′24″E
712-007	Villa Chiericati	Grumolo delle Abbadesse	Vicenza		45°30′16″N 11°39′12″E
712-008	Villa Forni Cerato	Montecchio Precalcino	Vicenza		45°39′11″N 11°33′40″E
712-009	Villa Godi	Lonedo di Lugo Vicentino	Vicenza		45°44′44″N 11°31′43″E
712-010	Villa Pisani	Bagnolo di Lonigo	Vicenza		45°21′31″N 11°22′10″E
712-011	Villa Pojana	Poiana Maggiore	Vicenza		45°16′54″N 11°30′03″E
712-012	Villa Saraceno	Agugliaro	Vicenza		45°18′38″N 11°35′12″E
712-013	Villa Thiene	Quinto Vicentino	Vicenza		45°34′22″N 11°37′47″E
712-014	Villa Trissino	Sarego	Vicenza		45°25′42″N 11°24′49″E
712-015	Villa Valmarana	Bolzano Vicentino	Vicenza		45°35′01″N 11°36′41″E
712-016	Villa Valmarana	Monticello Conte Otto	Vicenza		45°34′58″N 11°35′40″E
712-017	Villa Badoer, «La Badoera»	Fratta Polesine	Rovigo		45°01′48″N 11°38′46″E
712-018	Villa Barbaro	Maser	Treviso		45°48′20″N 11°58′48″E
712-019	Villa Emo	Vedelago	Treviso		45°42′43″N 11°59′23″E
712-020	Villa Zeno	Cessalto	Treviso		45°42′11″N 12°38′20″E
712-021	Villa Foscari, «La Malcontenta»	Mira	Venice		45°26′07″N 12°12′01″E
712-022	Villa Pisani	Montagnana	Padua		45°13′37″N 11°28′07″E
712-023	Villa Cornaro	Piombino Dese	Padua		45°36′14″N 11°59′57″E
712-024	Villa Serego	San Pietro in Cariano	Verona		45°29′58″N 10°55′32″E
712-025	Villa Piovene	Lugo Vicentino	Vicenza		45°44′48″N 11°31′36″E

=== Others ===
Other villas designed by Palladio but actually not included in the World Heritage list:

#	Name	Location	Province	Coordinates	Notes
	Wing of the Villa Thiene	Cicogna of Villafranca Padovana	Padua	45°30′11″N 11°47′32″E	unfinished, built only a barchessa
	Villa Repeta	Campiglia dei Berici	Vicenza	45°20′33″N 11°32′23″E	destroyed by a fire and rebuilt in other shape
	Villa Porto	Molina di Malo	Vicenza		unfinished
	Villa Porto	Vivaro di Dueville	Vicenza		uncertain attribution, but traditionally attributed to Palladio
	Villa Contarini	Piazzola sul Brenta	Padua	45°32′38″N 11°47′07″E	the original core of the villa was probably by Palladio
	Villa Arnaldi	Sarego	Vicenza		unfinished

In the Quattro libri (1570), Palladio published other projects of villas, but unrealized. Among them Villa Mocenigo a Marocco (now in Mogliano Veneto) and Villa Mocenigo alla Brenta.

== See also ==
- Palladian architecture
