= Villa Repeta =

Coordinates: 45°20′33″N 11°32′23″E

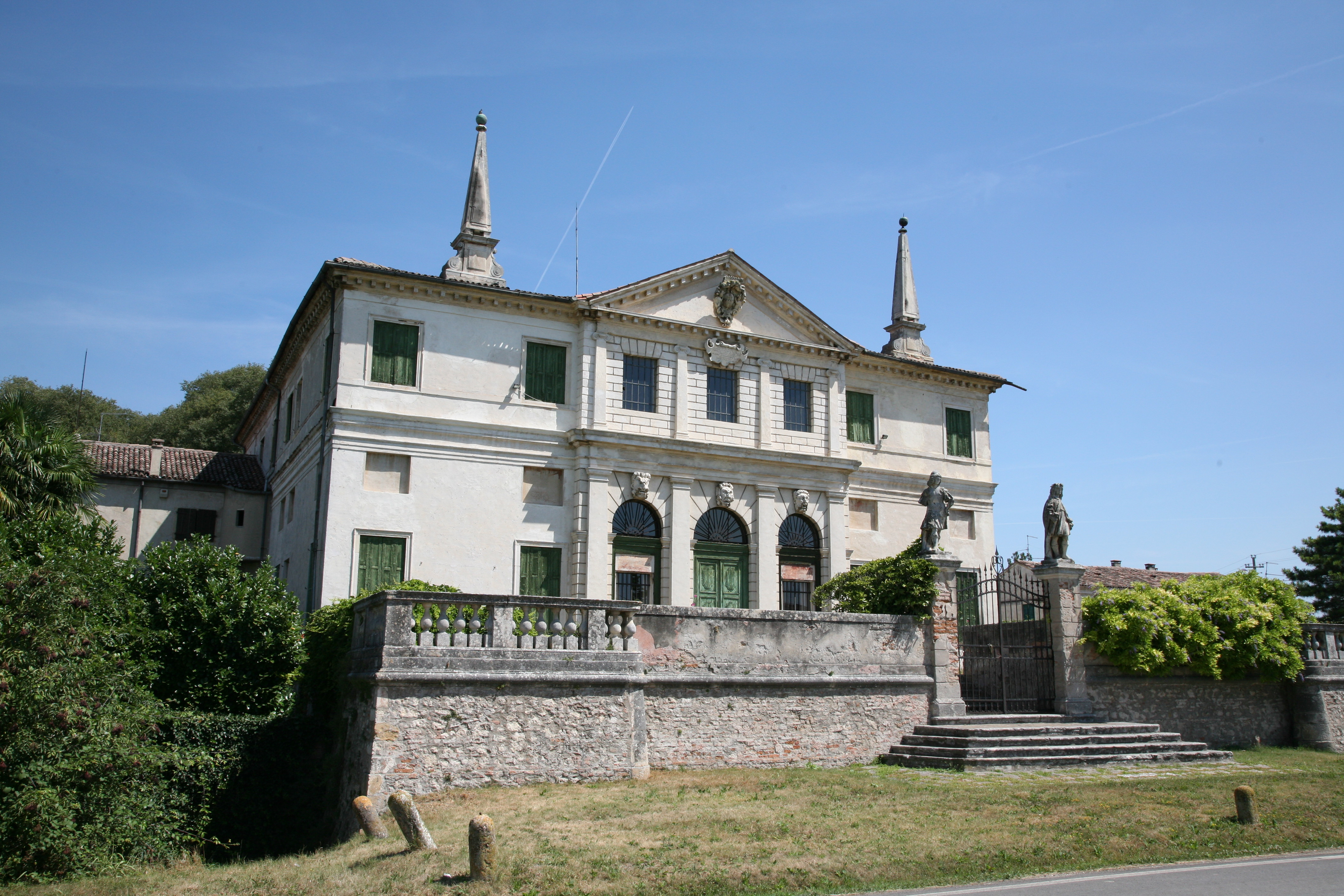
Villa Repeta.

Villa Repeta is a patrician villa in Campiglia dei Berici, province of Vicenza, northern Italy. It was built in 1672, substituting a pre-existing villa designed by Italian Renaissance architect Andrea Palladio about 1557 and destroyed by a fire.

== History ==
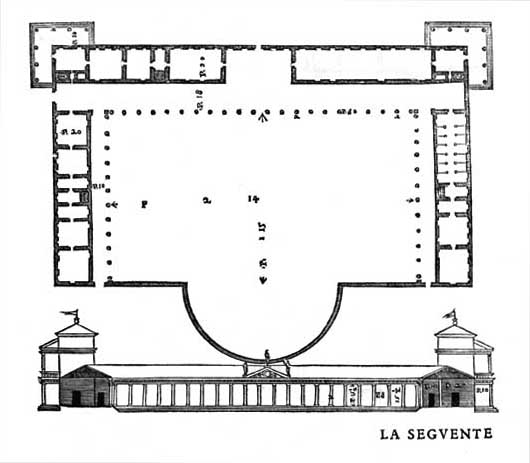
Floor plan of the (destroyed) villa published by Andrea Palladio in I quattro libri dell'architettura (Venice, 1570)

The villa which Palladio built for Mario Repeta – or at least the initial results of his building campaign – was destroyed by fire at an unspecified date, sometime between 1640 and 1672, when it was replaced by the existing new edifice. Therefore, Palladio’s Villa Repeta, designed around 1557, can only be reconstructed on the basis of the plate in the I quattro libri dell'architettura, although recent studies have raised serious doubts that the engraving can effectively correspond to the project. Rather they suggest that this plate represents Palladio’s usual, a posteriori, theoretical, re-elaboration of an idea, which was in reality compromised by major pre-existing features.

== Architecture ==
In any case, the project remains extraordinary among Palladio’s output: the structure has a continuous, Doric order, portico of only one storey, which develops entirely horizontally around a rectangular courtyard. The only vertical elements are the two dovecotes at the corners of the complex.

Without the usual hierarchical dialogue between a dominant manorial house and agricultural annexes, the design of the villa might represent the product of a precise initiative on the part of the patrons and reflect the heterodox and egalitarian ideas of the Repeta family (Mario Repeta was denounced to the Holy Office in 1569), restless protagonists in the public life of Vicenza during the 16th century.

The actual villa was built 1672 by Enea and Scipione Repeta.

== See also ==
- Palladian Villas of the Veneto
- Palladian architecture
