= Pisani family =

Venetian noble family

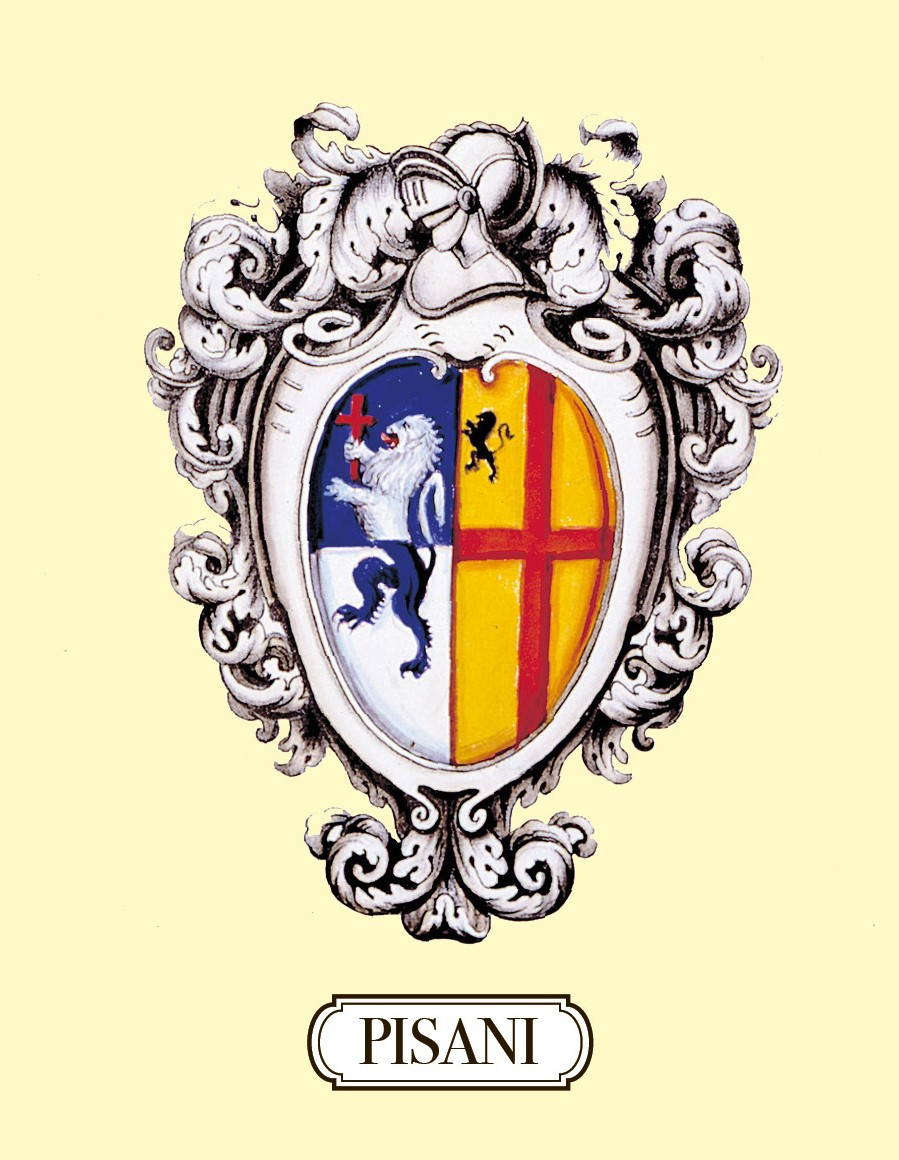
Coat of arms of Pisani family

The House of Pisani is a Venetian patrician family, originating from Pisa, which played an important role in the historic, political and economic events of the Venetian Republic during the period between the 12th and the beginning of the 18th century.

The principal male line of the family, namely the Pisanis of Santo Stefano, died out at the end of the 19th century.

== People ==
- Niccolò Pisani, (1324–1380), Venetian admiral, renowned for his victories in the Third Venetian–Genoese War (1350–55)
- Francesco Pisani (1494–1570), cardinal of the Catholic Church appointed by Pope Leo X
- Alvise Pisani (1664–1741), 114th Doge of Venice (1735–1741)
- Andrea Pisani (1662–1718), brother of Alvise, captain-general of the Venetian navy
- Domenico Pisani (fl. 1479–1486), Lord of Santorini
- Luigi Pisani, 16th-century Italian prelate
- Vettor Pisani (1324–1380), 14th-century admiral of the Venetian fleet
- Victor Pisani, interpreter and financial adviser to Umberto I and Victor Emmanuel III

== Villas ==
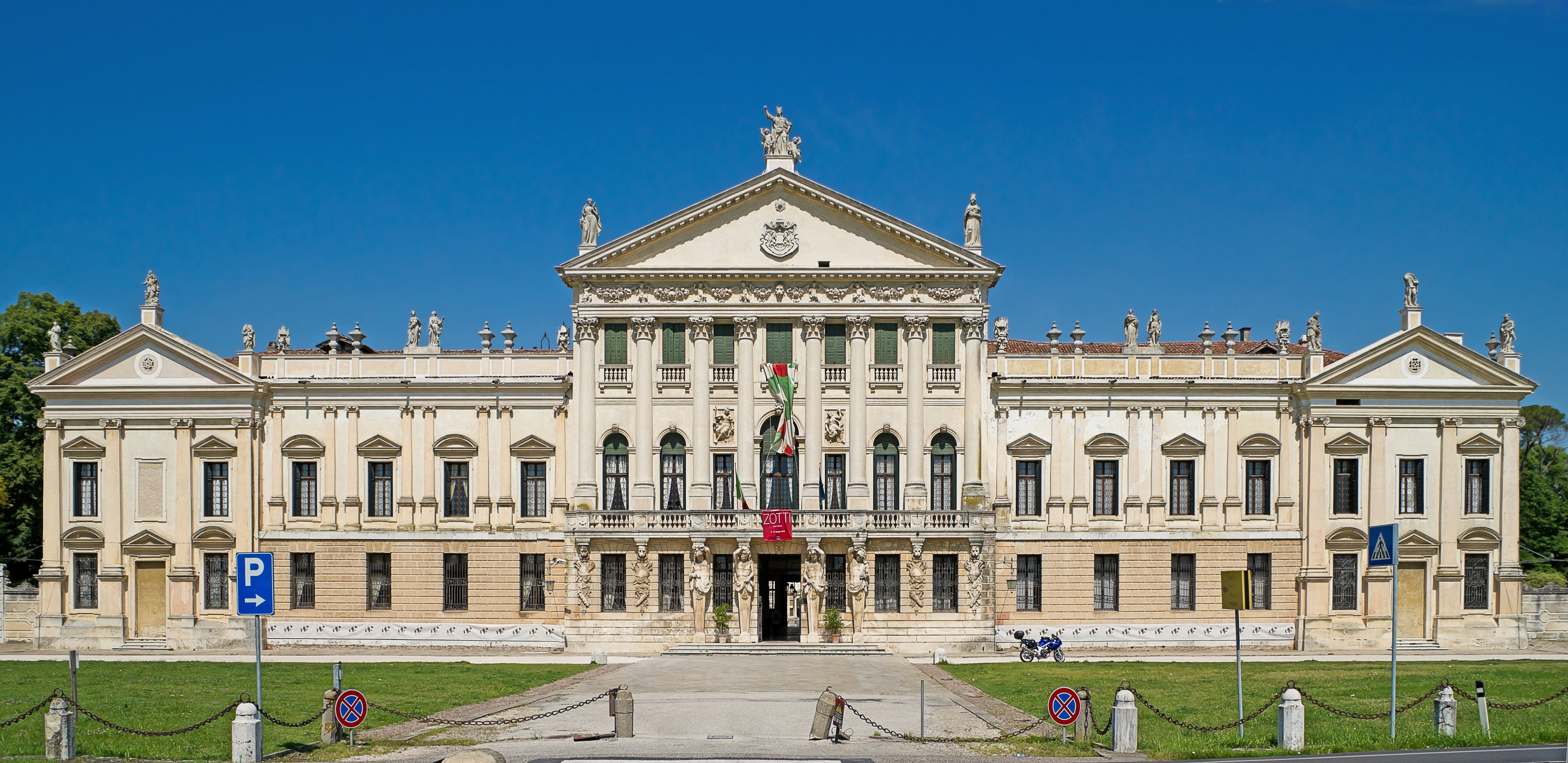
Villa Pisani in Stra

Many villas in the Veneto region were built, commissioned and owned by the Pisani family, including:

- Villa Pisani, also known as La Nazionale, situated in Stra (1721)
- Villa Pisani, situated in Montagnana and designed by Andrea Palladio (c. 1552)
- Villa Pisani, situated in Lonigo in the frazione of Bagnolo and designed by Andrea Palladio (1544)
- Villa Pisani, also known as Rocca Pisana, situated in Lonigo and designed by Vincenzo Scamozzi (1576)
- Villa Pisani Bolognesi Scalabrin, situated in Vescovana

== Palaces ==
Many palaces in Venice were owned by the Pisani family, including:

- Palazzo Pisani a San Stefano - massive palace in the campo near the Ponte dell'Accademia, housing a conservatory.
- Palazzo Pisani Gritti, in the San Marco district and facing the Grand Canal; now the Gritti Palace Hotel
- Palazzo Pisani Moretta, in the San Polo district and facing the Grand Canal
- Palazzo Soranzo Pisani, in the San Polo district and facing the Grand Canal
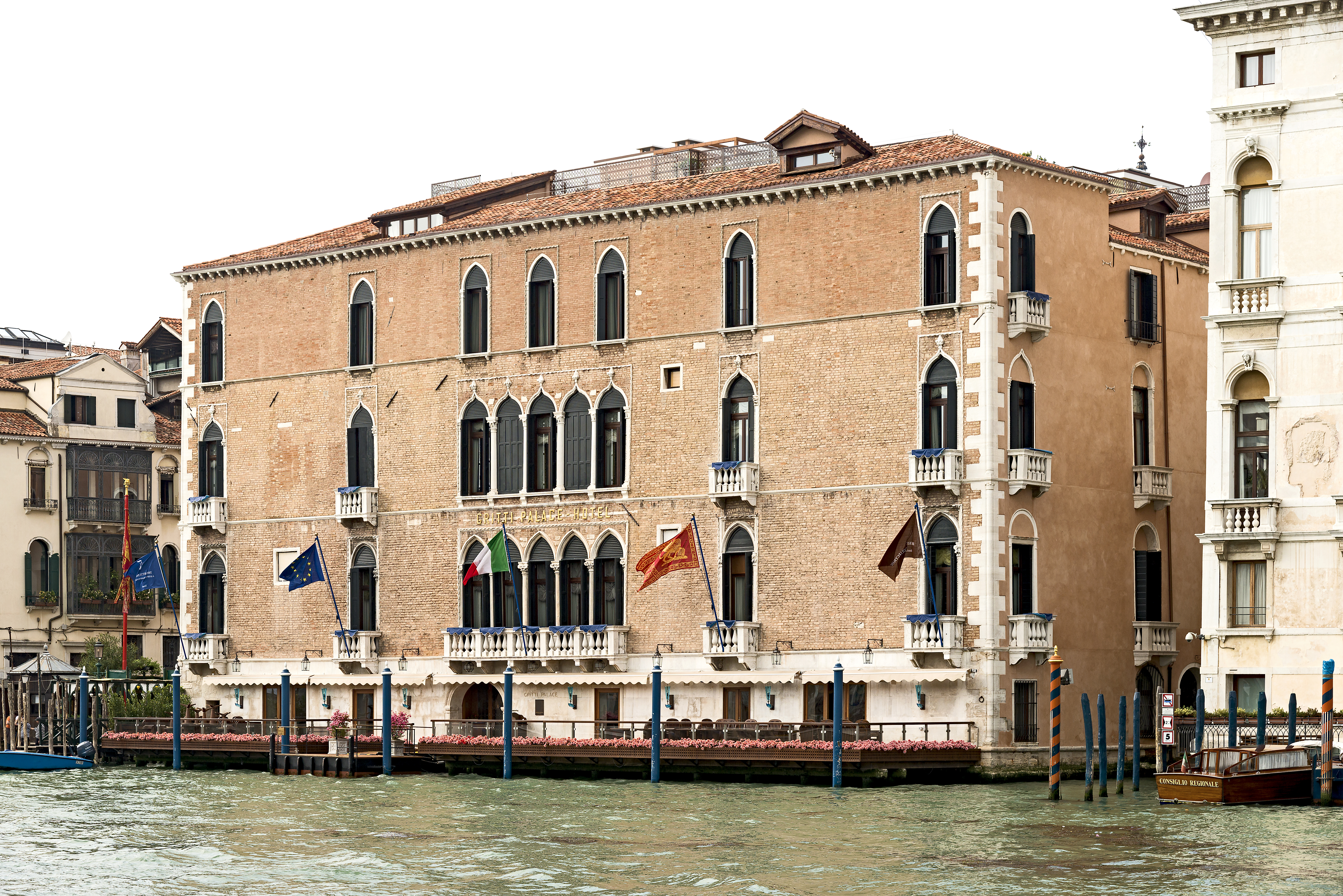
Palace Pisani Gritti in Venice

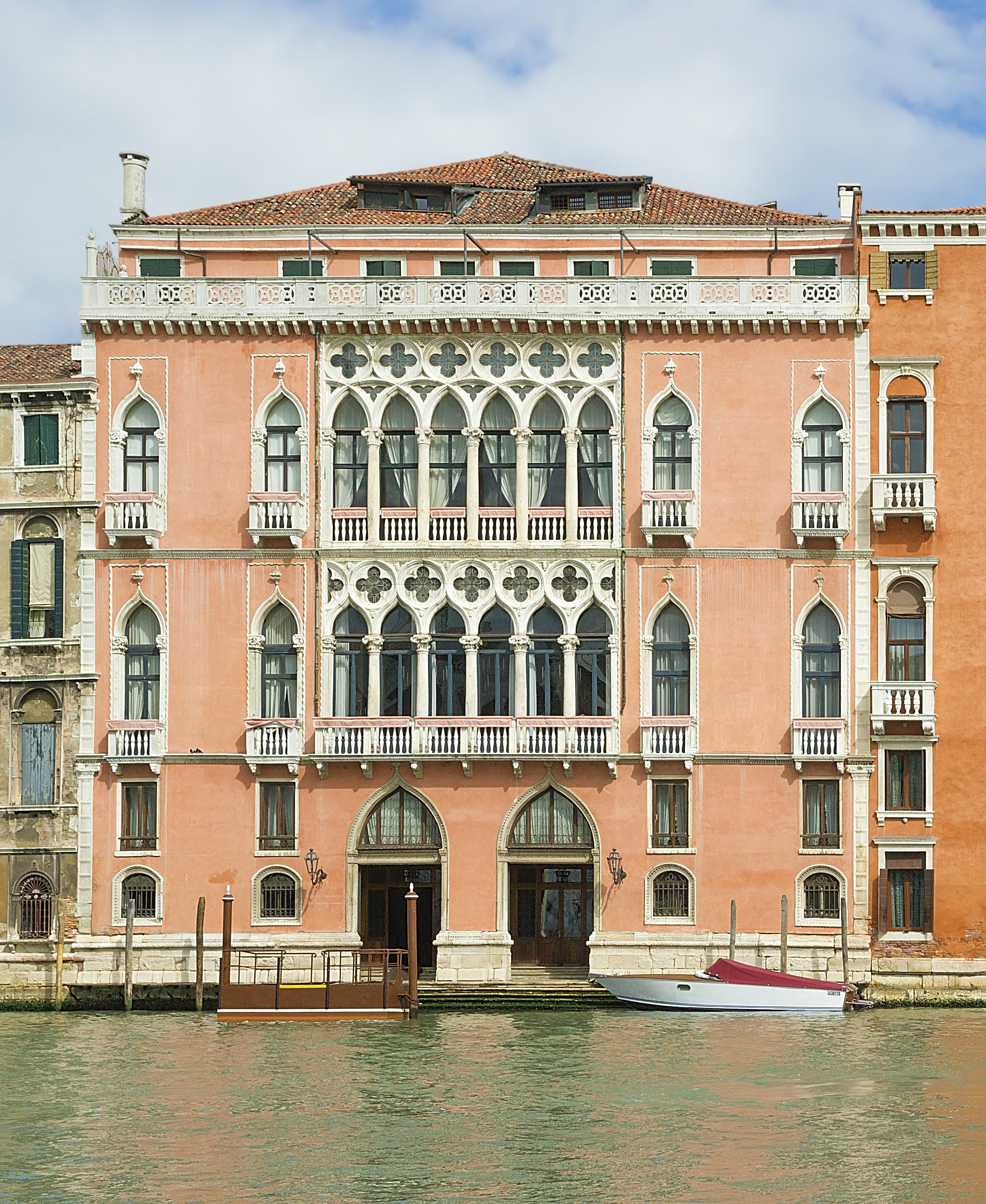
Palace Pisani Moretta in Venice
