= Palladian Villas =

Palladian Villas may refer to:

- Villas in the Palladian style inspired by Andrea Palladio
- Villas designed by Andrea Palladio, Palladian villas of Veneto
