= Villa Pisani, Bagnolo =

Coordinates: 45.357140°N 11.371381°E

Villa Pisani Bagnolo (built 1540s)
UNESCO World Heritage Site
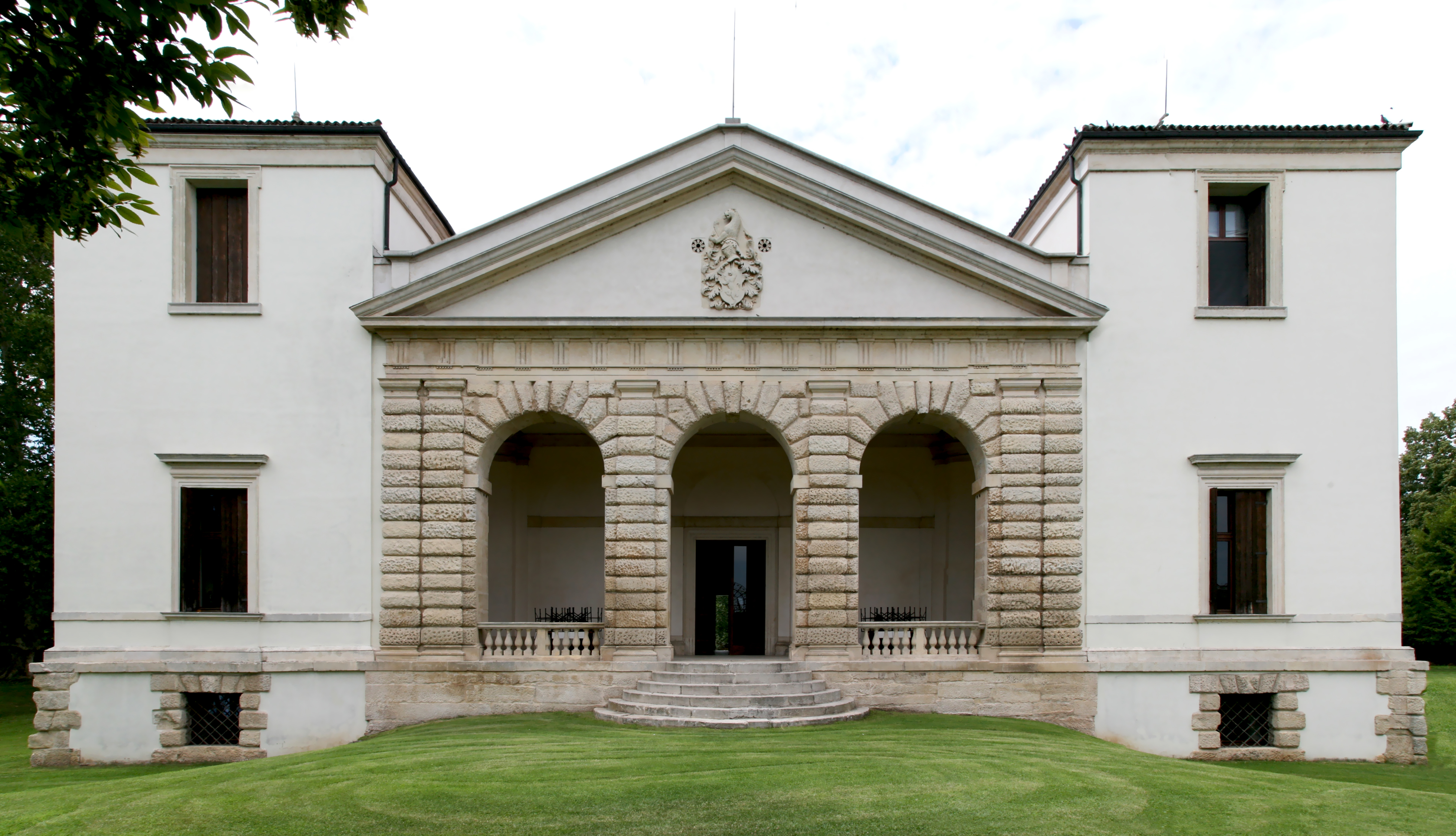

- Location within Veneto Location within Italy
- Location: Lonigo, Province of Vicenza, Veneto, Italy
- Part of: City of Vicenza and the Palladian Villas of the Veneto
- Criteria: Cultural: (i)(ii)
- Reference: 712bis-007
- Inscription: 1994 (18th Session)
- Extensions: 1996

The Villa Pisani is a patrician villa designed by Italian Renaissance architect Andrea Palladio, located in Bagnolo, a hamlet in the comune of Lonigo in the Veneto region of Italy.

== History ==
The Pisani were a rich family of Venetian nobles who owned several Villa Pisani, two of them designed by Andrea Palladio. The villa at Bagnolo was built in the 1540s and represents Palladio's first villa designed for a patrician family of Venice: his earlier villa commissions were from provincial nobility in the Vicenza area. The villa at Bagnolo was at the centre of an agricultural estate, as were most of the villas commissioned from Palladio. It was designed with rusticated features to complement its rural setting; in contrast, the Villa Pisani at Montagnana in a semi-urban setting usees more refined motifs.

In 1570, Palladio published a version of the villa in his I quattro libri dell'architettura. The executed villa differs noticeably from the design. The deviations may have been in response to certain conditions on the actual site.

An engraved ground plan of 1778 by Ottavio Bertotti Scamozzi, gives a clear idea of the villa as it appeared in the 18th century. There was originally a long barchessa (wing) at the back of the courtyard terminating in dovecotes that kept the villa supplied with squab; this wing was admired by Vasari, but it was demolished in the nineteenth century and replaced by a structure that bears no relation to the Palladian façade it faces.

The interior features a central T-shaped salone with barrel vaulting inspired by Roman baths; it is decorated with frescoes.

In 1996, UNESCO included the villa in the World Heritage Site "City of Vicenza and the Palladian Villas of the Veneto".

== Gallery ==
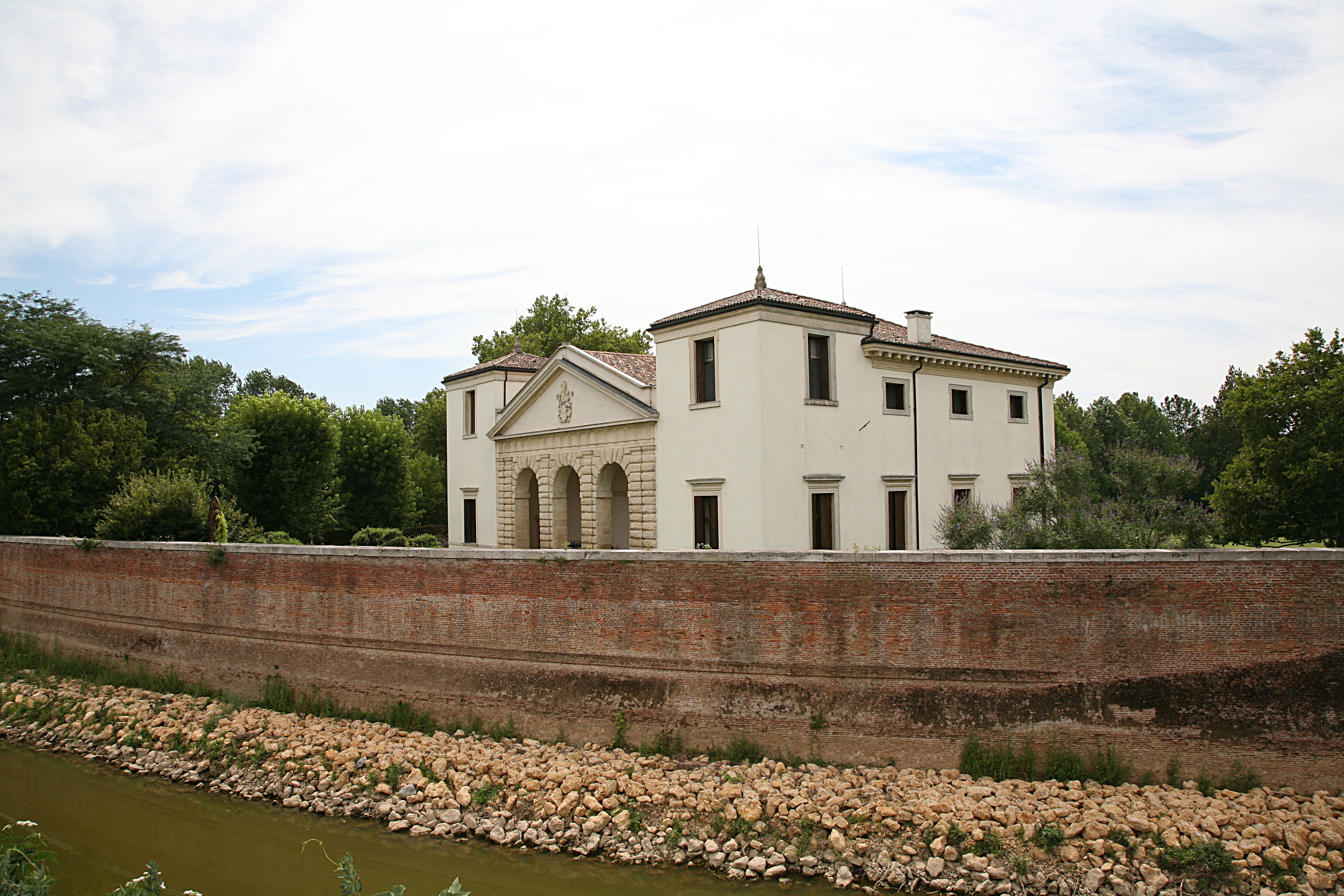
The Villa as seen from the embankment of the Guà river

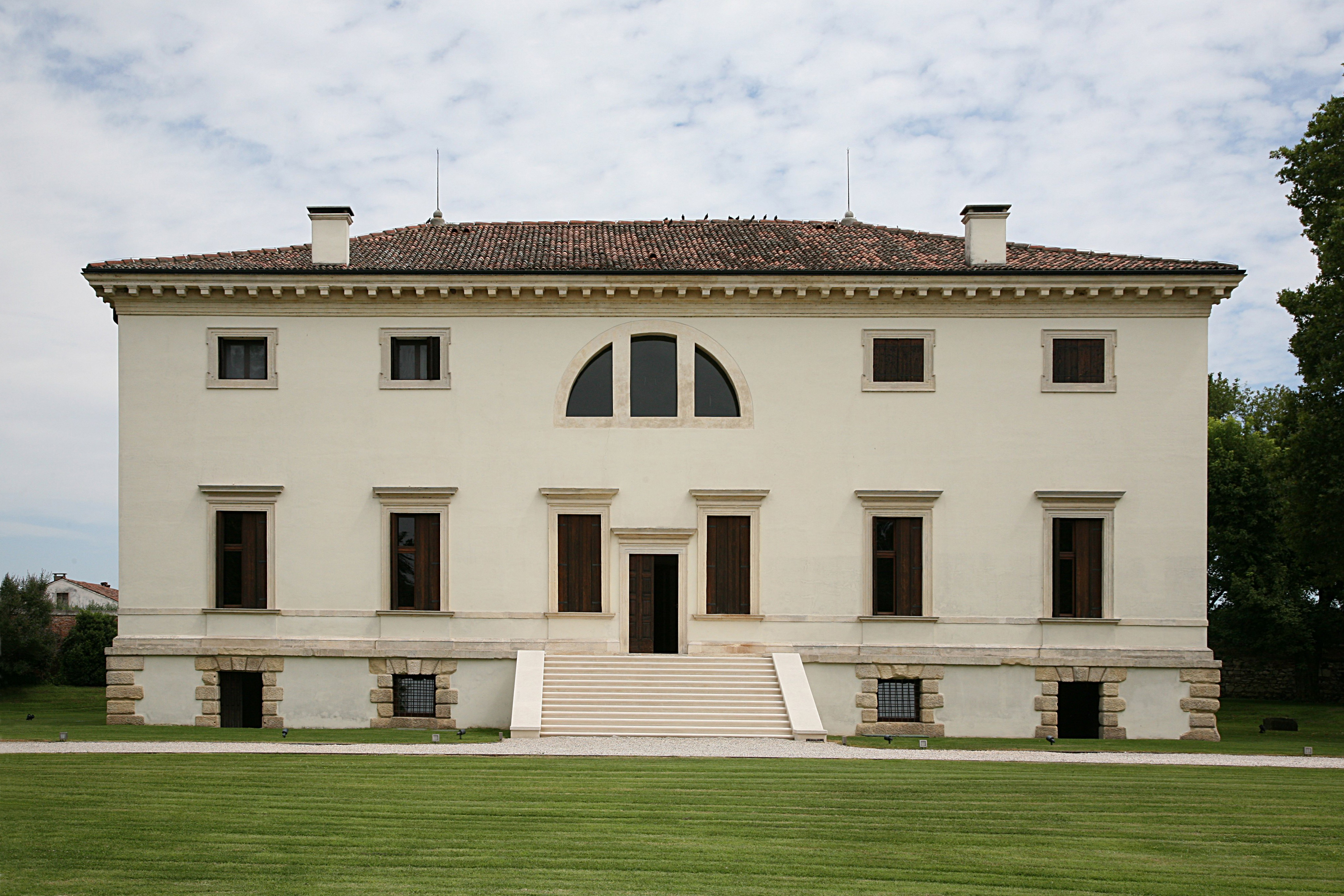
Rear façade

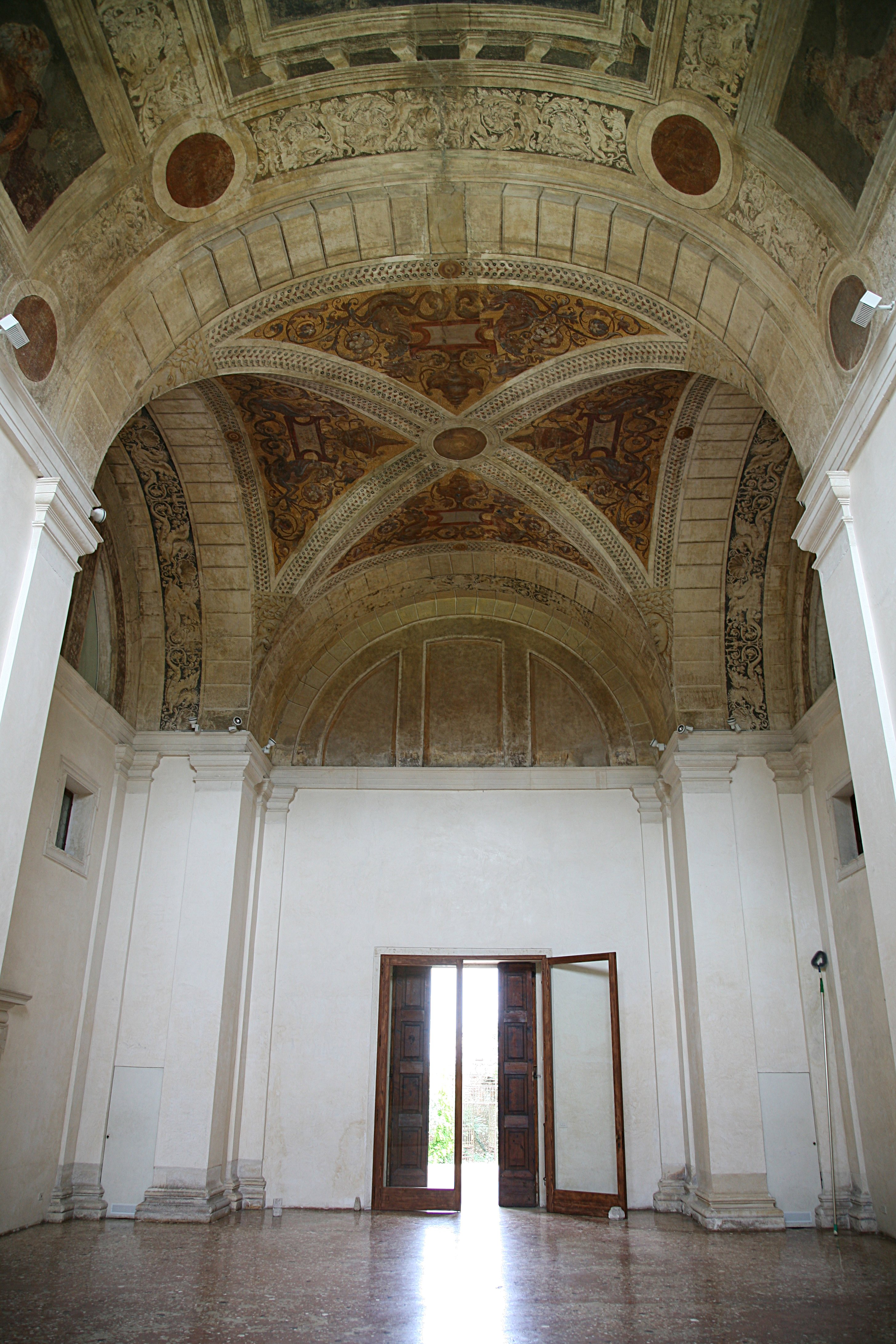
GreatHall

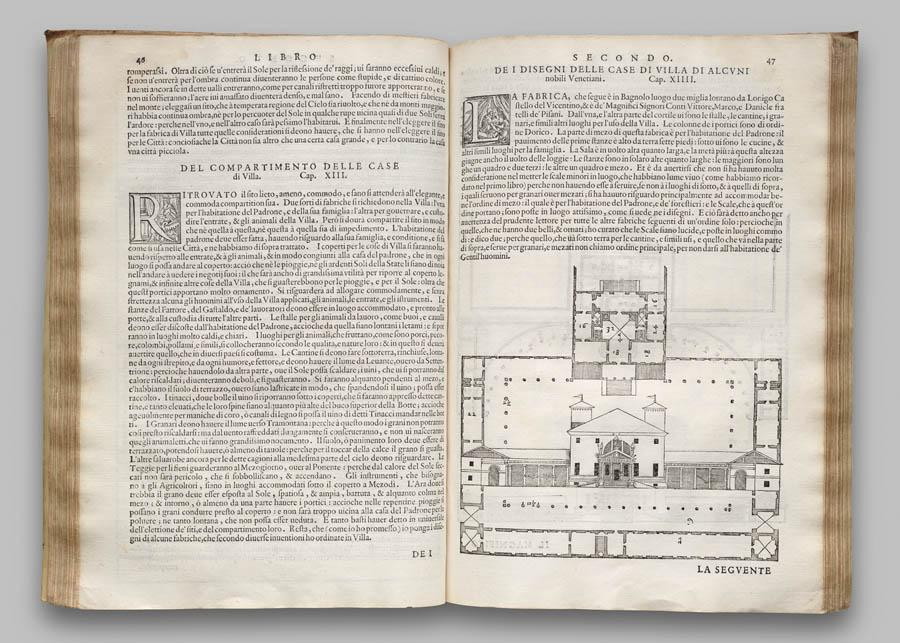
Villa Pisani in I quattro libri dell'architettura (book II), 1570

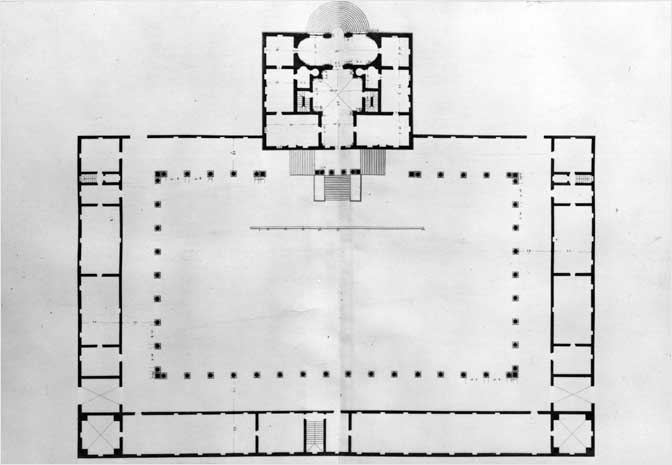
Section by Ottavio Bertotti Scamozzi, 1778

== See also ==
- Palladian Villas of the Veneto
- Villa Pisani, Stra
- Palladian architecture
