= Villa Porto (Vivaro di Dueville) =

Patrician villa in Vivaro di Dueville, Vicenza, Italy

Coordinates: 45.6179°N 11.5436°E

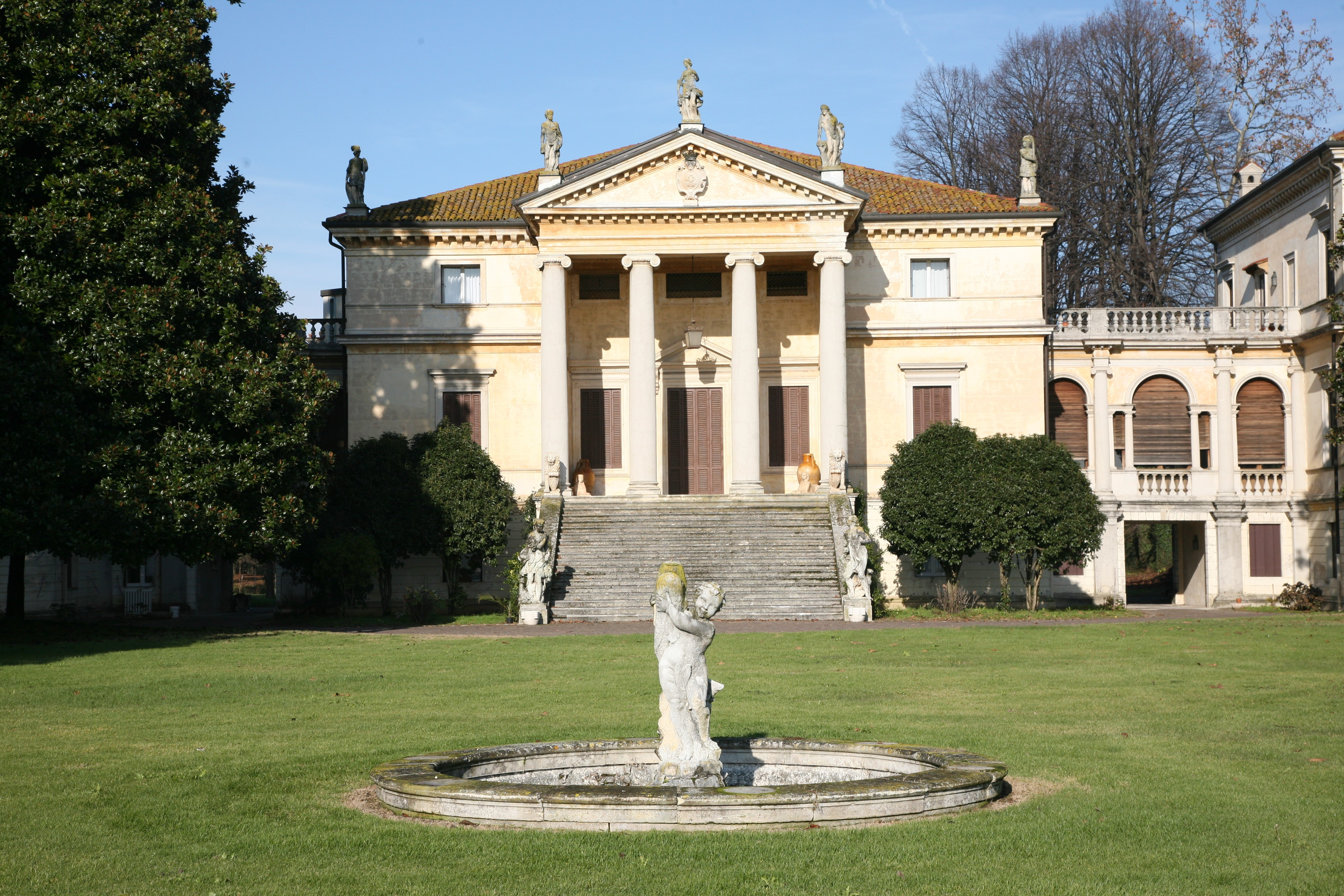
Villa Porto

Villa Porto is a patrician villa in Vivaro di Dueville, province of Vicenza, northern Italy, designed in 1554 and traditionally attributed to the Italian Renaissance architect Andrea Palladio, but not included by UNESCO in the strict list of Palladian Villas of Veneto within the World Heritage Site City of Vicenza and the Palladian Villas of the Veneto.

== History ==
In 1554, Paolo Porto and his brothers divided up their father's inheritance, Paolo acquiring an estate at Vivaro, north of Vicenza. Here, during the subsequent four years, he realised a villa which tradition holds was designed by Palladio. The Conte Paolo Porto, one of the most powerful canons of the Vicenza Cathedral (in 1550 he was on the point of becoming bishop) was a sophisticated and cultured man, who passed much time in Rome where he could count on the friendship of Cardinal Alessandro Farnese. Porto also numbered among his Vicentine friends and relatives Palladio's foremost patrons, men like Giangiorgio Trissino, Biagio Saraceno, Bernardo Schio, and Girolamo Garzadori.

== Attribution to Palladio ==
It is perhaps this network of friendships which most easily placed him in contact with Palladio, although in this regard careful inspection of the villa's architecture raises more doubts than certainties, for one discerns various successive constructional phases, which render the identification of an original Palladian scheme, if any, most difficult. The pronaos, for example, is grafted onto the main block with manifest discontinuity. Moreover, the two lateral wings are without doubt nineteenth-century, and actually the product of a belated "Palladianization" of the villa at the hands of the architect Antonio Caregaro Negrin.

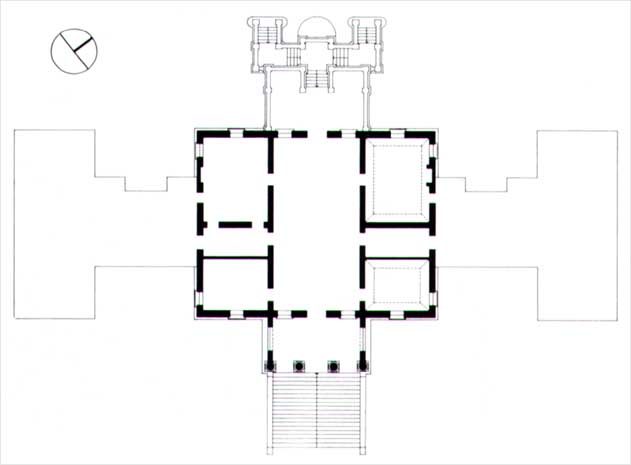
Floor plan (drawing by Cevese, 1971)

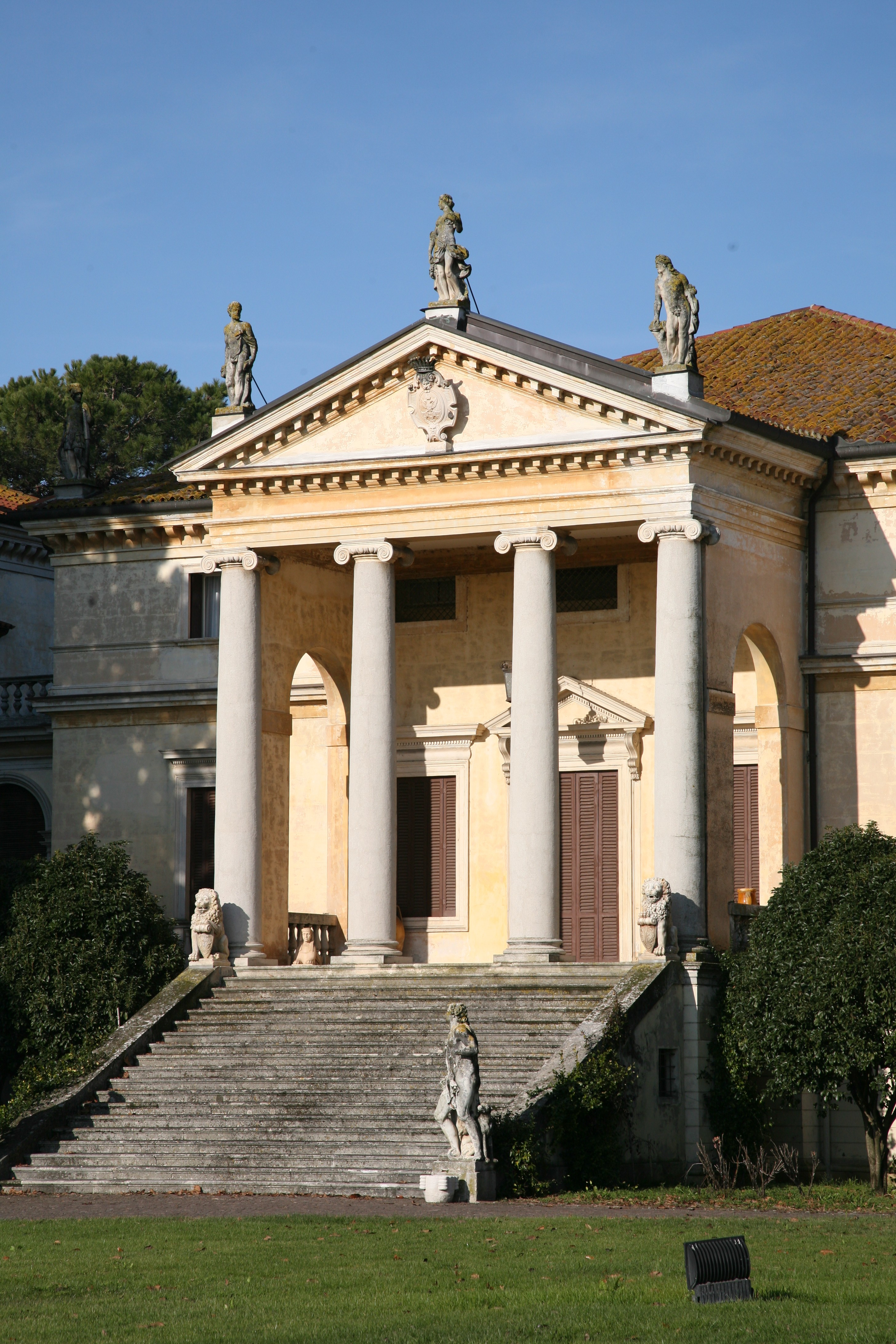
The pronaos

== See also ==
- Palladian Villas of the Veneto
- Palladian architecture
