= Campiglia dei Berici =

- Comune
- Comune di Campiglia dei Berici
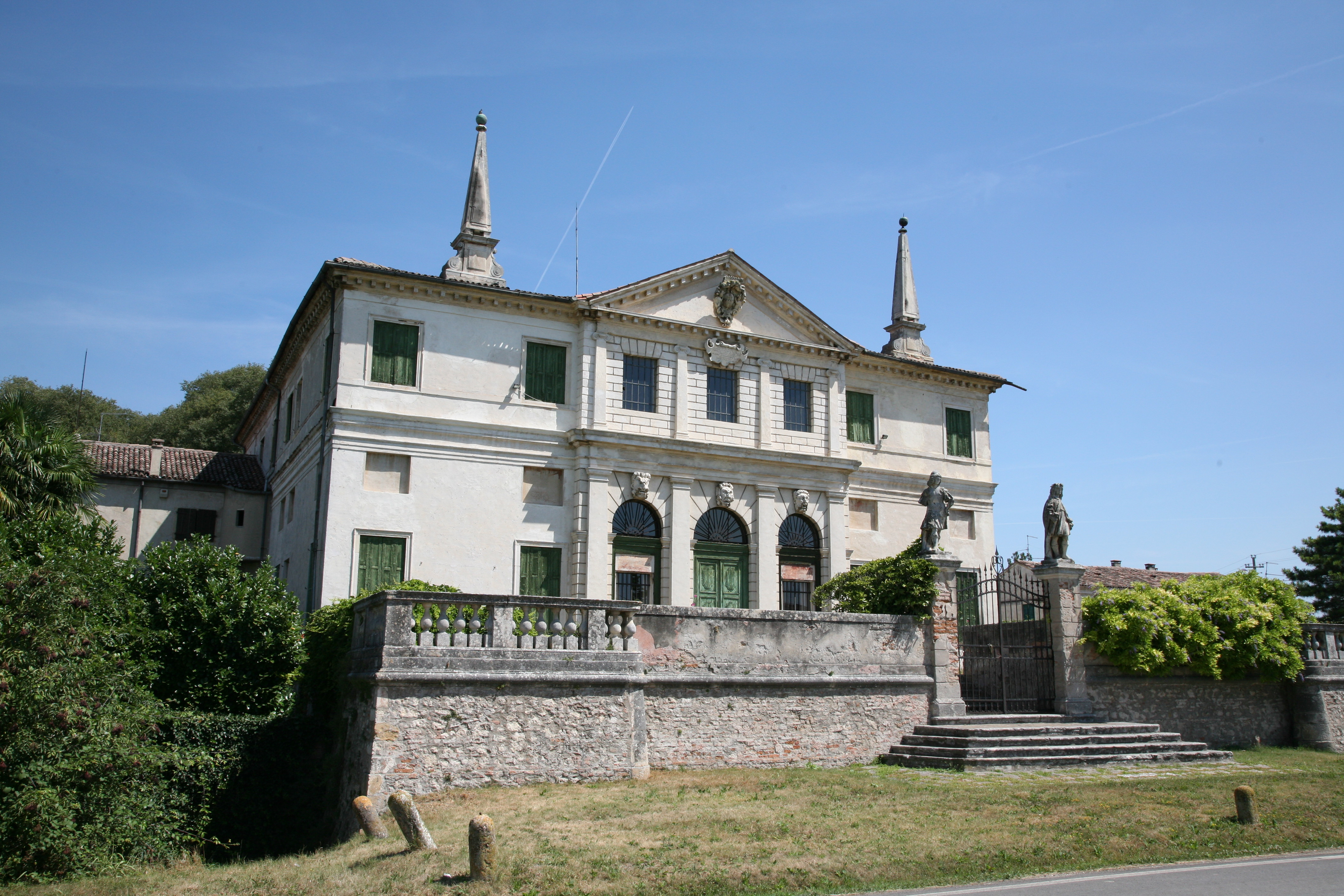
- Villa Repeta, Campiglia dei Berici

- Location within Italy Location within Veneto
- Coordinates: 45°20′N 11°32′E
- Country: Italy
- Region: Veneto
- Province: Vicenza (VI)

Government
  - Mayor: Massimo Zulian

Area
  - Total: 11.04 km^{2} (4.26 sq mi)
- Elevation: 16 m (52 ft)

Population (30 April 2017)
  - Total: 1,700
  - Density: 150/km^{2} (400/sq mi)
- Demonym: Campigliesi
- Time zone: UTC+1 (CET)
  - Summer (DST): UTC+2 (CEST)
- Postal code: 36020
- Dialing code: 0444
- Patron saint: Saint Peter
- Saint day: 21 June
- Website: Official website

Campiglia dei Berici is a town in the province of Vicenza, Veneto, Italy. It is west of SP247 provincial road. It originated in the Middle Ages around a castle, destroyed in the 1310s. Sights include a parish church (13th century, rebuilt in 1679) and Villa Repeta-Mocenigo-Bressan, built in 1672 above the ruins of a villa by Andrea Palladio.

== Sources ==
- (Google Maps)
