= Villa Pisani, Montagnana =

Coordinates: 45°13′49.81″N 11°28′10.34″E

UNESCO World Heritage Site
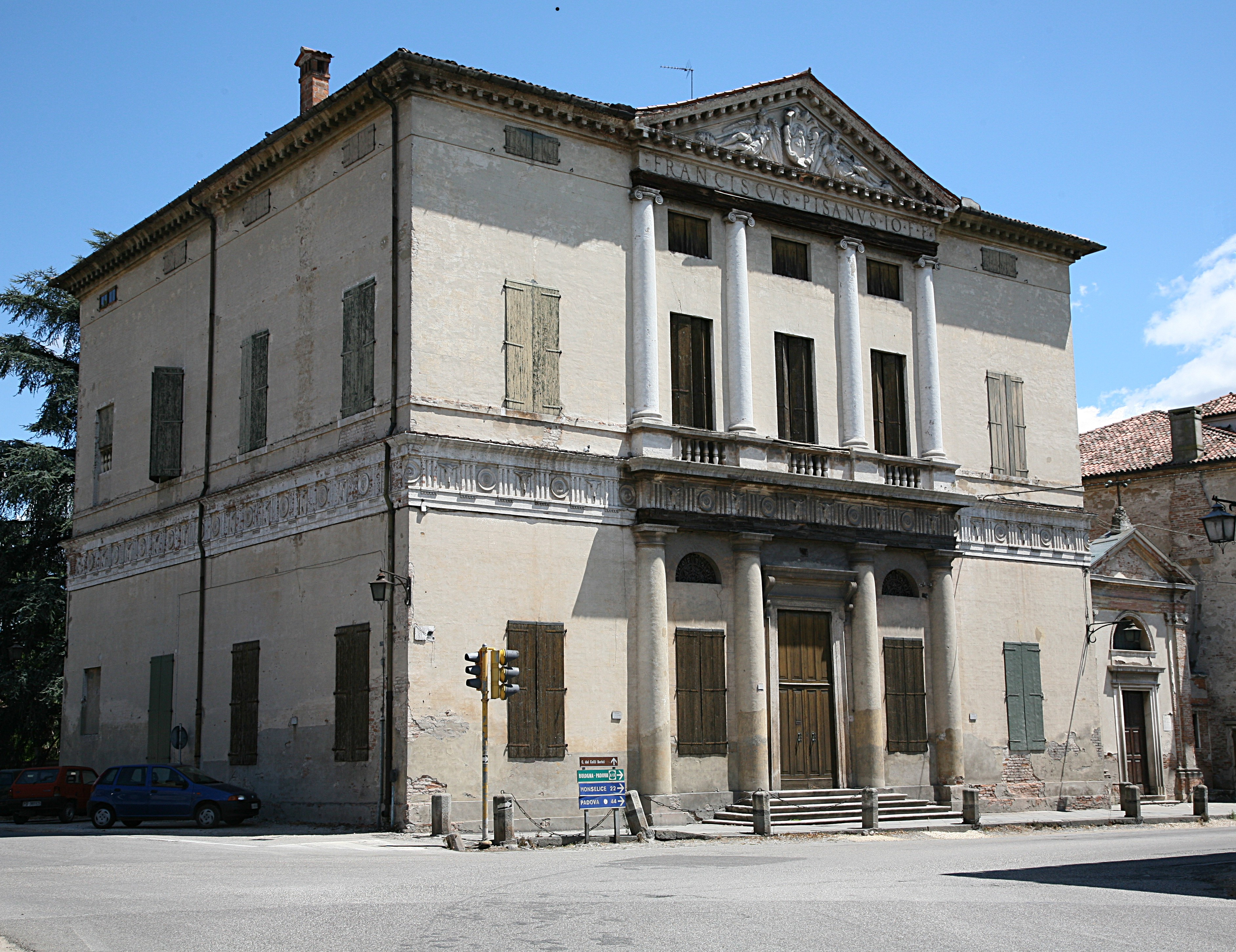
- Villa Pisani

- Location within Veneto Location within Italy
- Location: Montagnana, Province of Padova, Veneto, Italy
- Part of: City of Vicenza and the Palladian Villas of the Veneto
- Criteria: Cultural: (i), (ii)
- Reference: 712bis-022
- Inscription: 1994 (18th Session)
- Extensions: 1996

The Villa Pisani is a patrician villa outside the city walls of Montagnana, Veneto, northern Italy.

== Architecture ==
It was designed by Italian Renaissance architect Andrea Palladio about 1552, for Cardinal Francesco Pisani. Pisani was also a patron of the painters Paolo Veronese and Giambattista Maganza and the sculptor Alessandro Vittoria, who provided sculptures of the Four Seasons for the villa, which is in fact provided with fireplaces to dispel winter chill. Unlike more typical Palladian villas – and their imitations in Britain, Germany and the United States – the Villa Pisani at Montagnana combines an urban front, facing a piazza of the comune, and, on the other side, a rural frontage extending into gardens, with an agricultural setting beyond.

Unlike many of Palladio's villas in purely rural settings, it has an upper storey, set apart from more public reception rooms on the main floor; twin suites of apartments are accessed by twin oval staircases that flank the central recess on the garden side. On the exterior, little differentiation between floors is made: there is no obviously visible piano nobile. On the garden front, access to the park is from the central recessed portico only; a balustrade above a deep ditch keeps out informal wanderers.

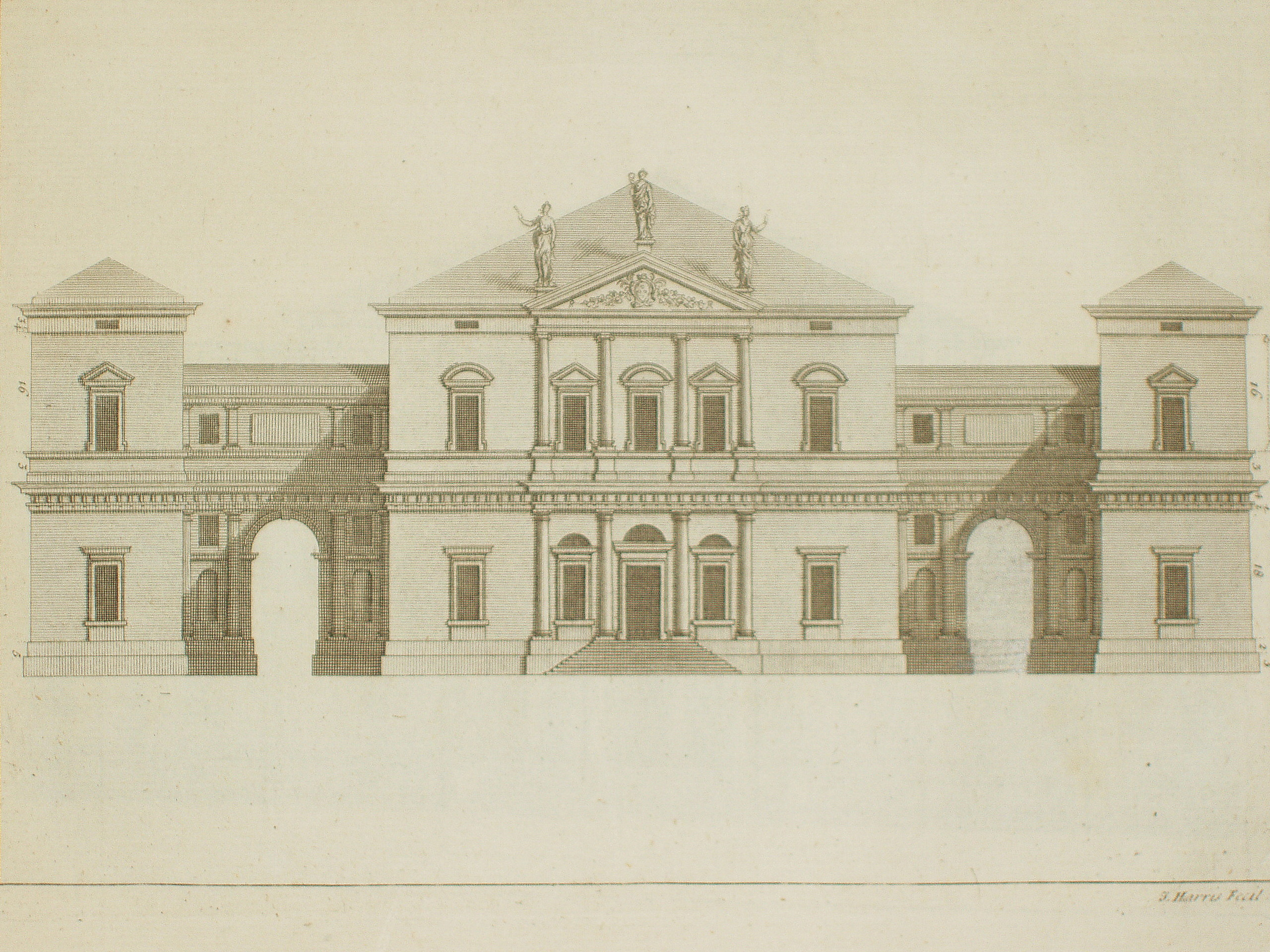
The Villa Pisani at Montagnana from I quattro libri dell'architettura, Giacomo Leoni, 1742. Not built as planned.

Construction of the villa was under way by September 1553, and it was complete in 1555. The central block is an uncompromising rectangle, with a pedimented tetrastyle portico, Ionic over Doric, that has been sunk into its wall-plane so that the columns are embedded half-columns. On the garden front, the similar structure instead forms a screen across the fronts of a recessed portico surmounted by a loggia, which become in single recessed central feature. The Doric frieze runs uninterrupted round the building, further binding all elements together. There are no surviving autograph drawings related to this project. However, Palladio published a version of the building in his I quattro libri dell'architettura. The woodcut shows an idealized, amplified form of the villa, in which the central block is flanked by arched gateway structures that end in tall, three-storey tower-like pavilions.

== Conservation ==
In 1996, UNESCO included the Villa Pisani in the World Heritage Site "City of Vicenza and the Palladian Villas of the Veneto". The villa continues to be in private ownership.

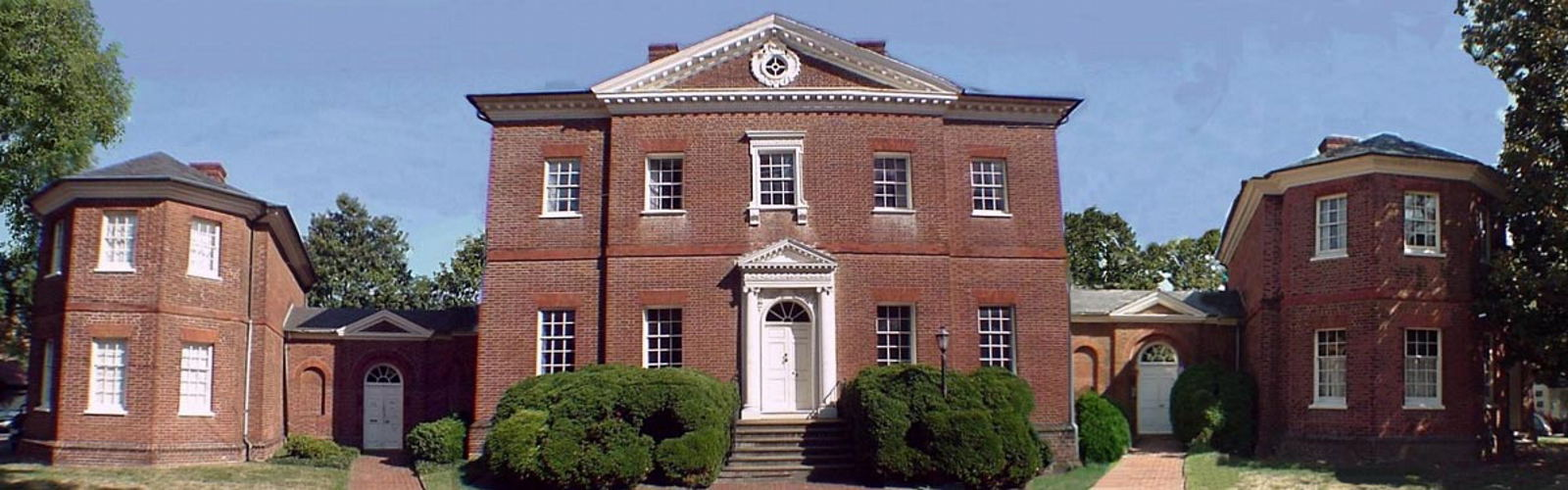
Hammond-Harwood House Main Facade

== Influence on other buildings ==
The Hammond-Harwood House in Annapolis, Maryland, Kinlet Hall in the United Kingdom, the old main building of the Ludwigsburg Palace, Drayton Hall in South Carolina, and Wilanów Palace in Warsaw were all inspired by Palladio's designs for the Villa Pisani.

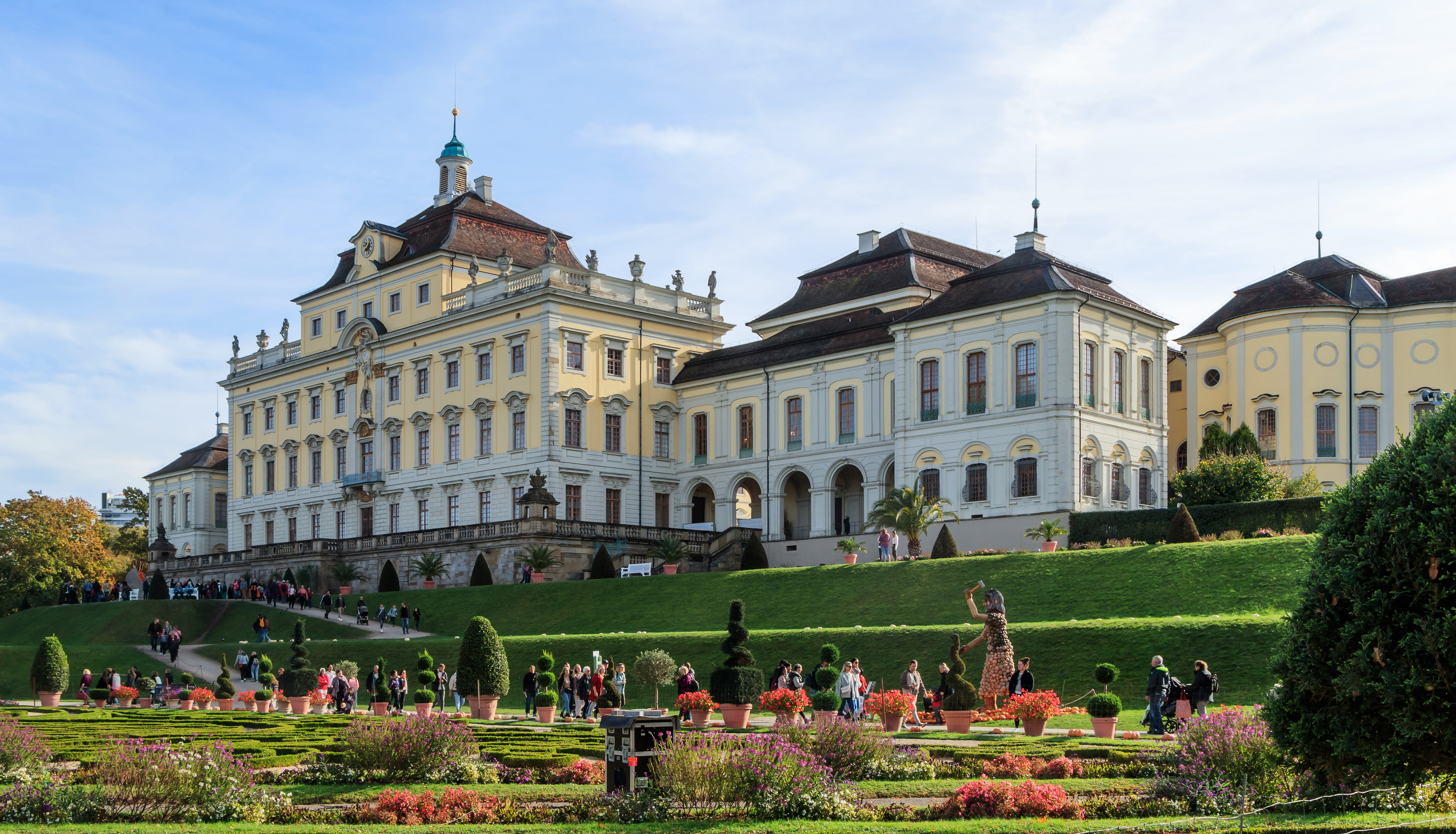
Like the Villa Pisani, the garden facade consists of a main building that is connected to two pavilions by galleries.

== See also ==
- Palladian Villas of the Veneto
- Palladian architecture
