= Palazzo Pisani Gritti =

Building in Venice, Italy

Coordinates: 45°25′54″N 12°20′00″E

The Palazzo Pisani Gritti is a Venetian Gothic palazzo. It is located on the north side of the Grand Canal, opposite the Church of the Salute, between the Campo del Traghetto and the Rio de l'Alboro, in the Sestieri of San Marco, Venice, Italy. It was the residence of Doge Andrea Gritti in the 16th century. It is now the Gritti Palace Hotel.

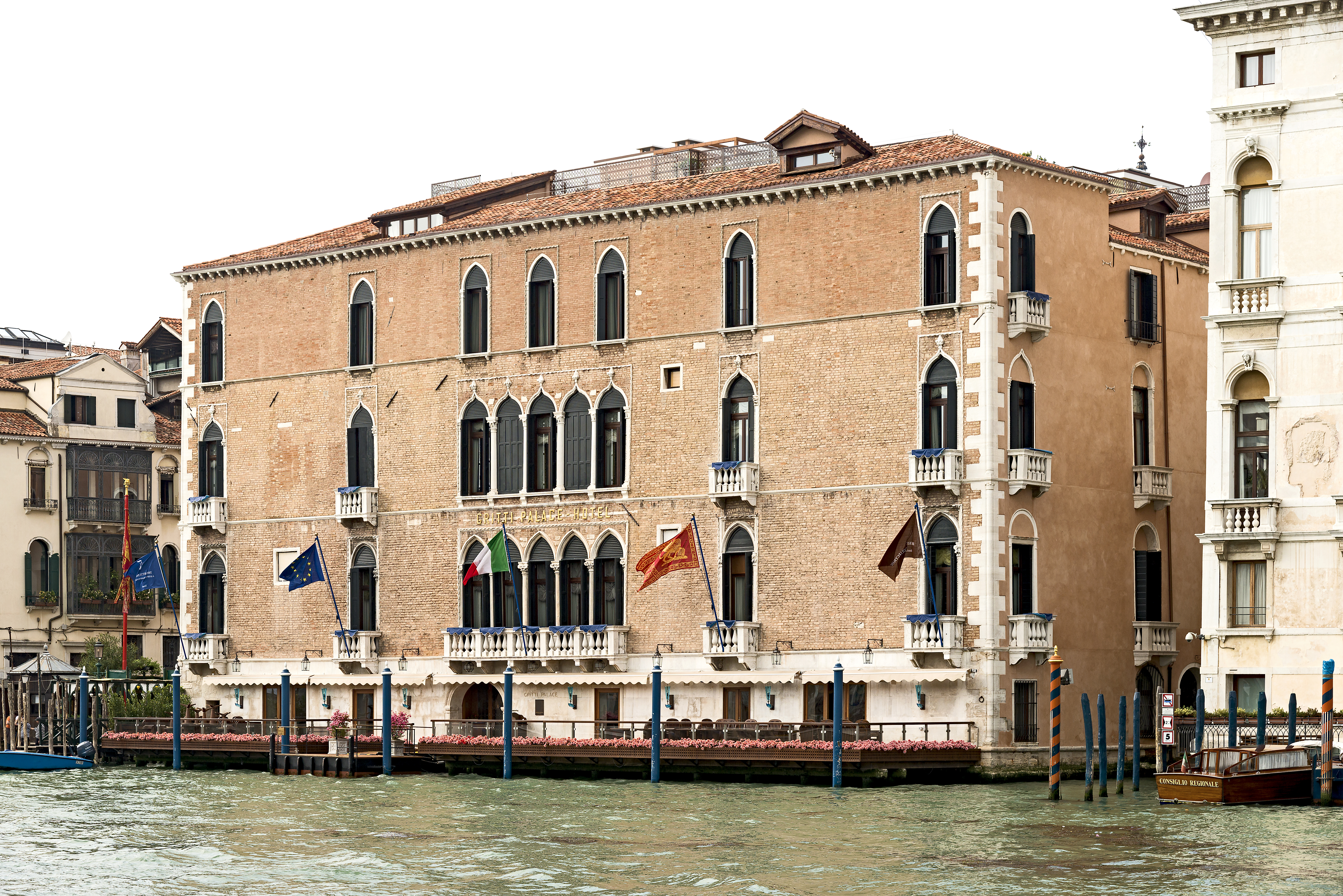
Palazzo Pisani Gritti

== History ==
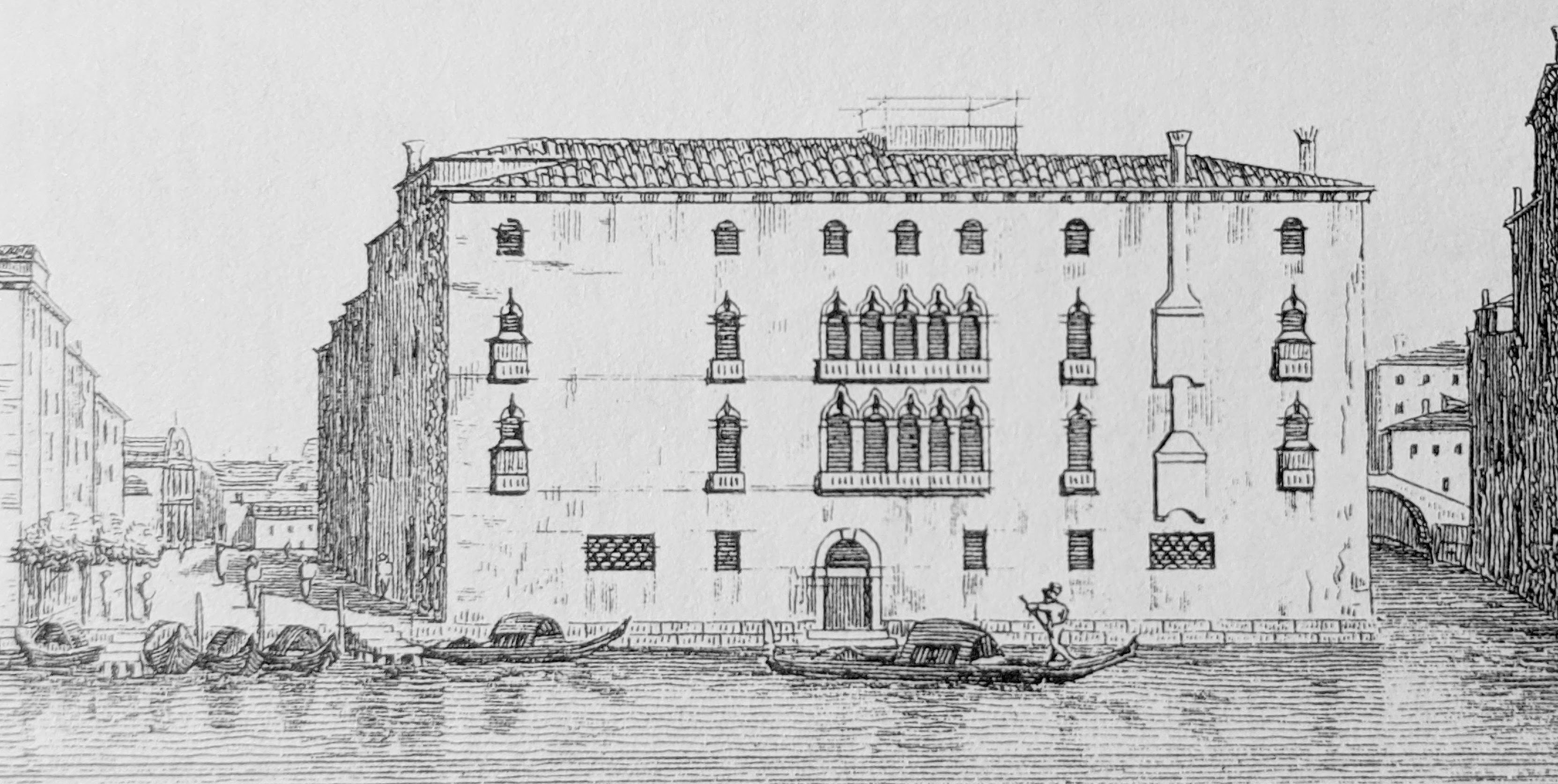
The Palazzo in 1828

The original palace was built in the 14th century. It was redesigned in Venetian Gothic style for the Pisani family in 1475. In 1525, it became the private residence of Doge Andrea Gritti. The second facade on the Campo was designed in the 16th century. The canal facade once had frescoes, now lost, by Giorgione. An additional story was added in the late 19th century.

== Hotel ==
The palace remained a private residence in the 19th century, but took paying guests. John Ruskin and his wife Effie lived at the Palazzo Gritti while he wrote The Stones of Venice.

In 1895, it became a hotel, connected to an adjoining hotel. In 1947, it was bought by the Compagnia Italiana Grandi Alberghi and renamed the Gritti Palace Hotel. It became part of Starwood in 1994. It had a major renovation in 2011–2013. Starwood was bought by Marriott International in 2016. The hotel itself is now a part of Marriott's "The Luxury Collection".

The luxury hotel has 82 rooms, including 10 suites. It has two restaurants, the Club del Doge, and the Gritti Terrace directly on the Grand Canal, which offers food as well as the Bar Longhi and the Riva Lounge. There is also a cooking school, the Gritti Epicurean School, in the hotel.

== In film ==
Several exterior and interior scenes in Michelangelo Antonioni's Identification of a Woman (1982) were filmed at the Gritti, as were several scenes in Woody Allen's Everyone Says I Love You (1996). The roof is used as the exterior of the secret lair of the Mission Impossible in Dead Reckoning.

== Bibliography ==
- Marcello Brusegan. La grande guida dei monumenti di Venezia. Roma, Newton & Compton, 2005 ISBN 88-541-0475-2
- Guida d'Italia – Venezia ed Milano, Touring Editor, 2007 ISBN 978-88-365-4347-2
