= I quattro libri dell'architettura =

1570 treatise on architecture by Andrea Palladio

The Four Books of Architecture
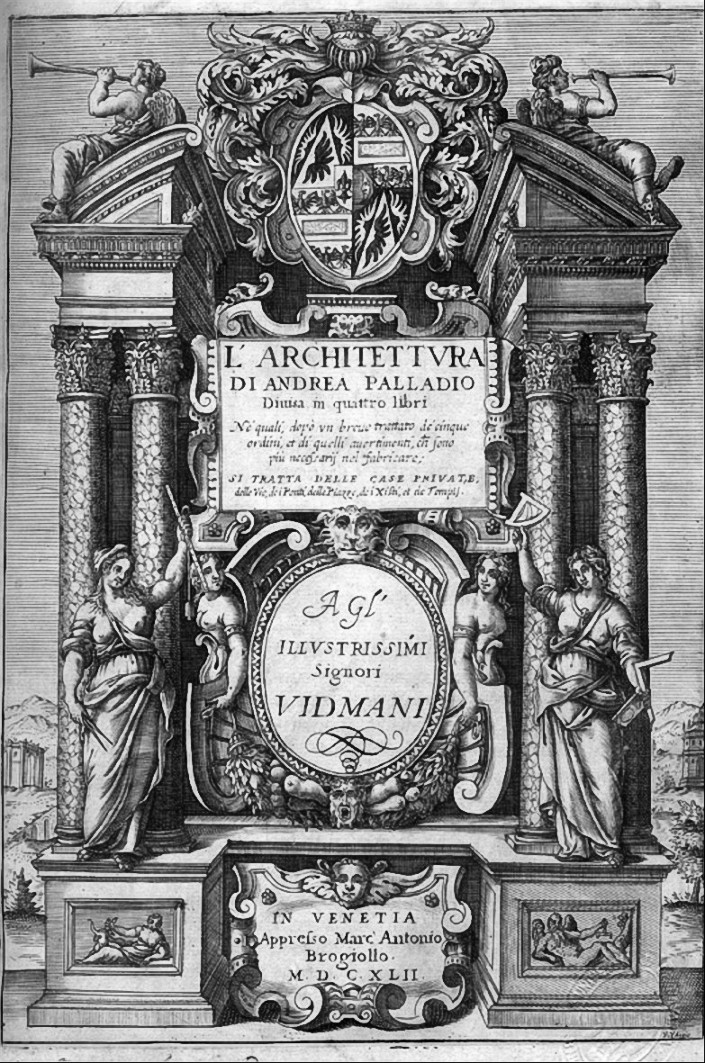
- Front page of I quattro libri dell'architettura
- Author: Andrea Palladio
- Original title: I quattro libri dell'architettura
- Translator: Giacomo Leoni
- Illustrator: Andrea Palladio
- Language: Italian
- Subject: Architecture
- Genre: Non-fiction
- Published: 1570
- Publisher: Dominico de' Franceschi
- Publication place: Italy
- English publication date: John Watts, London, 1716-1720
- Media type: Print

I quattro libri dell'architettura (The Four Books of Architecture) is a treatise on architecture by the architect Andrea Palladio (1508–1580), written in Italian. It was first published in four volumes in 1570 in Venice, illustrated with woodcuts after the author's own drawings. It has been reprinted and translated many times, often in single-volume format.

Book I was first published in English in 1663 in a London edition by Godfrey Richards. The first complete English language edition was published in London by the Italian-born architect Giacomo Leoni in 1715–1720.

== Organization ==
The treatise is divided into four books:

The first book discusses building materials and techniques. It documents five classical orders (Doric, Ionic, Corinthian, Tuscan, Composite) in all their parts (bases, columns, architraves, arches, capitals, trabeations), as well as discussing other building elements (vaulted ceilings, floors, doors and windows, fireplaces, roofs and stairs).

The second book covers the designs of private urban townhouses and country villas of the 1500s, in and around Venice, almost all designed by Palladio himself. This includes nine palazzi, 22 villas (13 of them completed, another five partly completed), and a series of unrealized projects. The plates of completed projects sometimes differ from the buildings as actually constructed.

The third book addresses matters of city planning: streets, stone street paving, bridges of both stone and wood, and piazzas, with examples drawn from Roman origins alongside contemporary examples; also basilicas, including the basilica designed by Vitruvius in Fano and the important Basilica Palladiana in Vicenza.

The fourth book contains five chapters of general introduction, then 26 chapters, each of which describe the designs of specific Roman temples dating from antiquity, along with one contemporary church design. (The exception is the San Pietro in Montorio, designed by Donato Bramante, consecrated in the year 1500.) Palladio's selections range geographically from Rome, Naples, Spoleto, Assisi, Pola and Nîmes. Illustrations of the temples include careful measurements of existing building elements, together with Palladio's own conjectural interpretations of the temple's facades where only fragments remained, as at the Temple of Trajan.

The 26 temples discussed in include:

- Chap. VI. Of the Draughts of some ancient Temples that are in Rome, and first of the Temple of Peace (Temple of Peace, Rome)

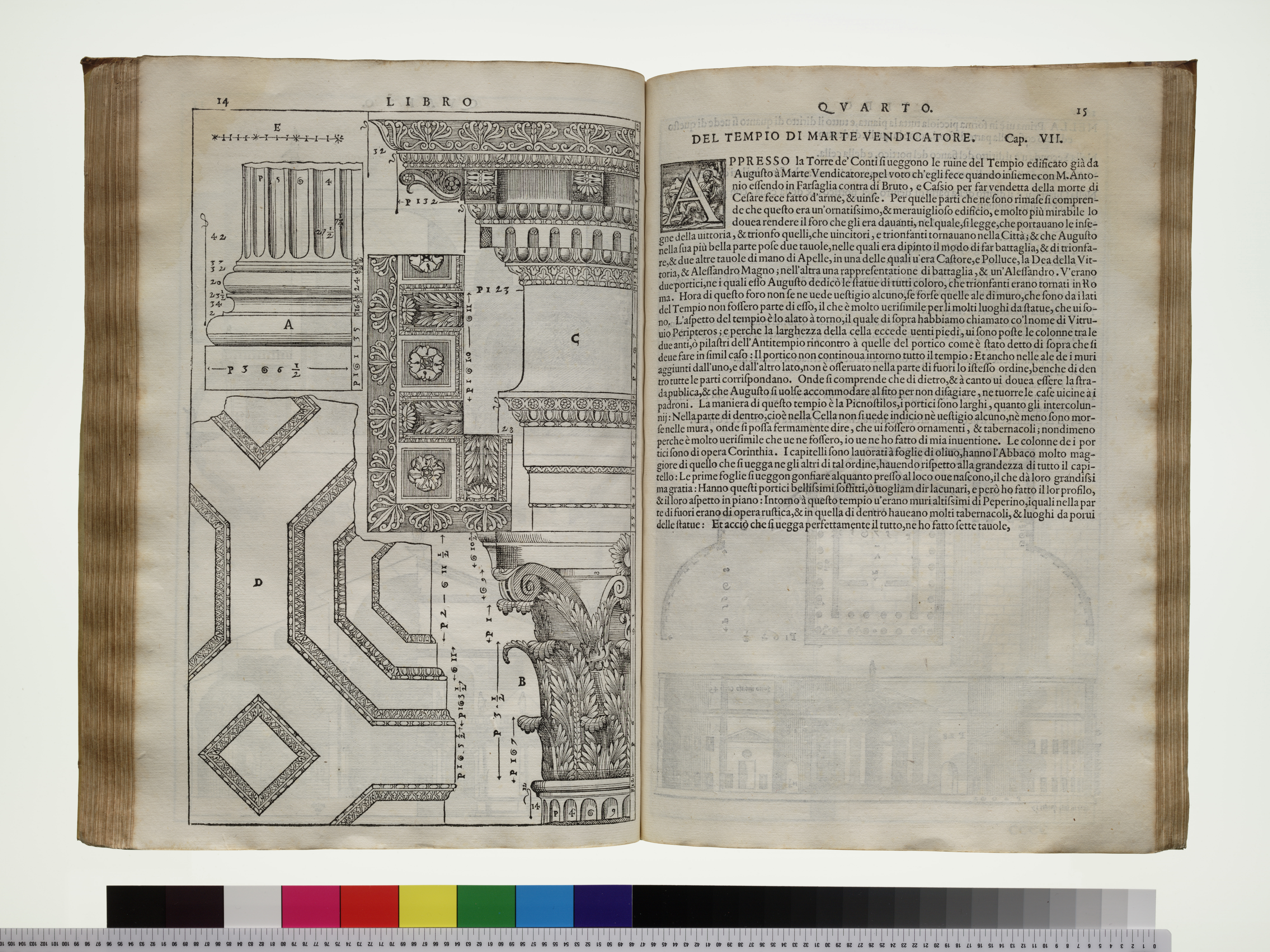
Chap. VII. Of the Temple of Mars the Avenger, I quattro libri dell'architettura, 1570. From the Rosenwald Collection, Library of Congress.

- Chap. VII. Of the Temple of Mars the Avenger (at the Forum of Augustus)
- Chap. VIII. Of the Temple of Nerva Trajan (Temple of Trajan)
- Chap. IX. Of the Temple of Antoninius and Faustina (Temple of Antoninus and Faustina)
- Chap. X. Of the Temples of the Sun and Moon (Temple of Venus and Roma)
- Chap. XI. Of the Temple vulgarly call'd the "Galluce" (Temple of Minerva Medica (nymphaeum))
- Chap. XII. Of the Temple of Jupiter (Temple of Seraphis)
- Chap. XIII. Of the Temple of Fortuna virilis, or Manly Fortune (Temple of Portunus)
- Chap. XIV. Of the Temple of Vesta (Temple of Vesta)
- Chap. XV. Of the Temple of Mars (Temple of Hadrian)
- Chap. XVI. Of the Baptism of Constantine (Lateran Baptistery)
- Chap. XVII. Of the Temple of Bramante (San Pietro in Montorio)
- Chap. XVIII. Of the Temple of Jupiter Stator (Temple of Jupiter Stator (2nd century BC))
- Chap. XIX. Of the Temple of Jupiter the Thunderer (Temple of Jupiter Feretrius)
- Chap. XX. Of the Pantheon, now call'd the Rotonda. (Pantheon, Rome)
- Chap. XXI. Of the Draughts of some Temples that are out of Rome, or in other parts of Italy; and the first of the Temples of Bacchus (Santa Costanza)
- Chap. XXII. Of the Temple whose Vestiges are seen near St. Sebastian's Church on the Appian Way (Santi Cosma e Damiano )

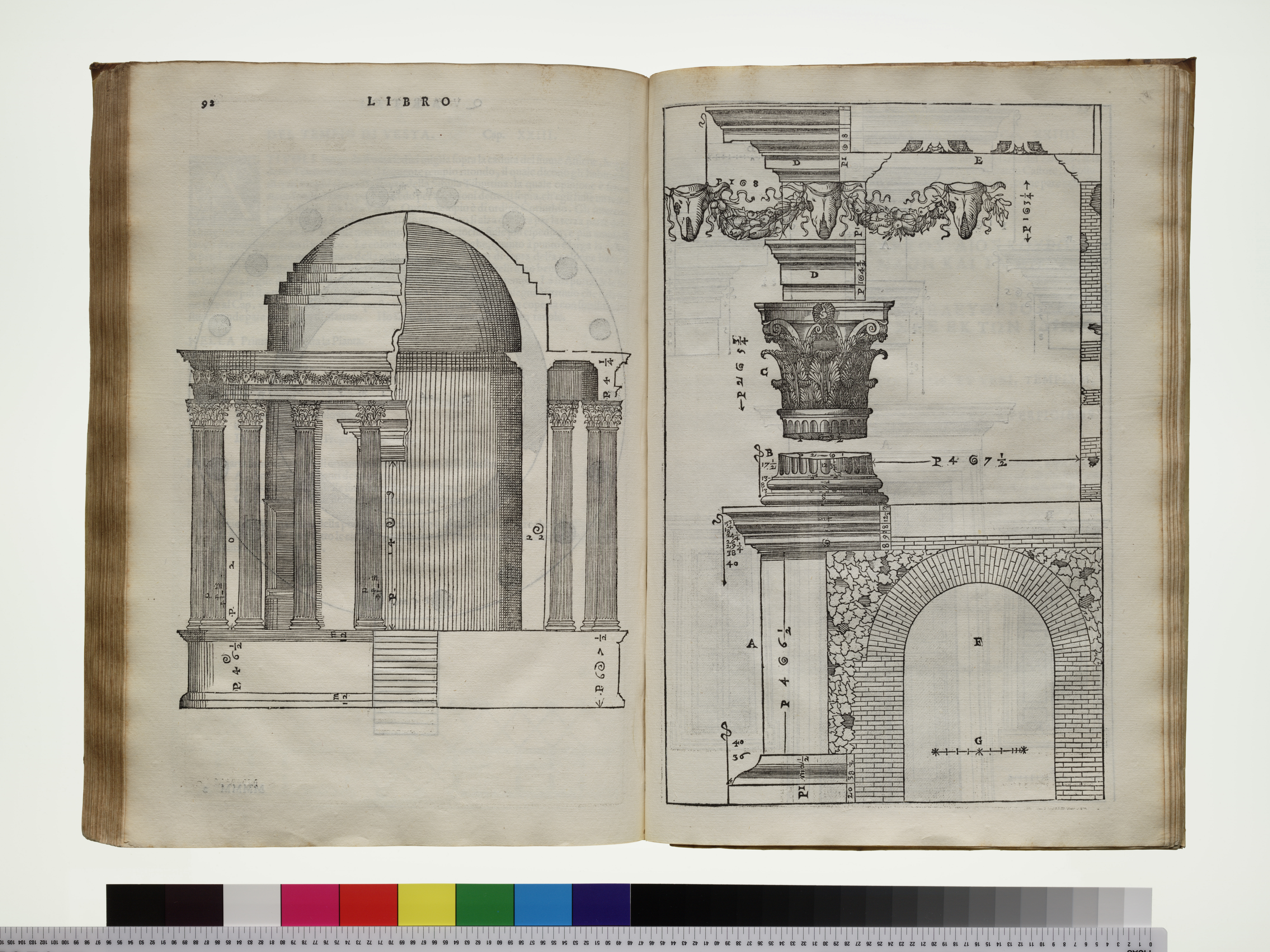
Chap. XXIII. Of the Temple of Vesta, I quattro libri dell'architettura, 1570. From the Rosenwald Collection, Library of Congress.

- Chap. XXIII. Of the Temple of Vesta (Temple of Vesta, Tivoli)
- Chap. XXIV. Of the Temple of Castor and Pollux (San Paolo Maggiore)
- Chap. XXV. Of the Temple which is below Trevi (Temple of Clitumnus)
- Chap. XXVI. Of the Temple of Scisi (Temple of Minerva, Assisi)
- Chap. XXVII. Of the Draughts of some Temples which are out of Italy; and first of the two temples of Pola (Temple of Augustus, Pula)
- Chap. XXVIII. Of the two Temples at Nîmes; of first of that which is call'd la Maison quarrée, or the square House (Maison Carrée)
- Chap. XXIX. Of the other Temple of Nîmes (Temple of Diana, Nîmes)
- Chap. XXX. Of two other Temples at Rome, and first of the Temple of Concord (Temple of Saturn)
- Chap. XXXI. Of the Temple of Neptune (Temple of Neptune (Rome))

== Author ==
Palladio founded an architectural movement which takes its name from him, Palladian architecture. I quattro libri dell'architettura contains Palladio's own designs celebrating the purity and simplicity of classical architecture. Some of these ideas had got no further than the drawing board while others, for example villa plans, had been successfully built. The book's clarity inspired numerous patrons and other architects. Palladian architecture grew in popularity across Europe and, by the end of the 18th century, had extended as far as North America. Thomas Jefferson, President of the United States, was a keen admirer of Palladio and once referred to the book as "the Bible". The Four Books was used to inform his own work as the architect of Monticello and the University of Virginia and also architect William Buckland's at the 1774 Hammond-Harwood House in Annapolis, Maryland.

Palladio drew inspiration from surviving Roman buildings, Roman authors (especially the architect Vitruvius) and Italian Renaissance architects. However, The Four Books of Architecture provided systematic rules and plans for buildings which were creative and unique. Palladio's villa style is based on details applied to a structural system built of bricks. He offers two types of general rules in the corpus: design rules (those based on appearance) and construction rules (those based on the logic of villa construction). Here rules of the two types are identified in sets from which subsets of identifiers and rules can be written.

Each of the nine rule-sets contains many sub-identities of components and procedures for physical construction. A rule-set such as “Walls”, that identifies five sub-rules based on wall thickness, only needs construction rules; there is no need for rules based on style. In contrast, rules for “Frames” are based on a geometric style of curves and shape proportions. The results will yield clear identities for a shape grammar composition that can be based on physical construction and visual style.

== Rule-sets ==
These identities are taken from the first book of architecture and a survey of built villas. These are the nine rule-sets that define identity:

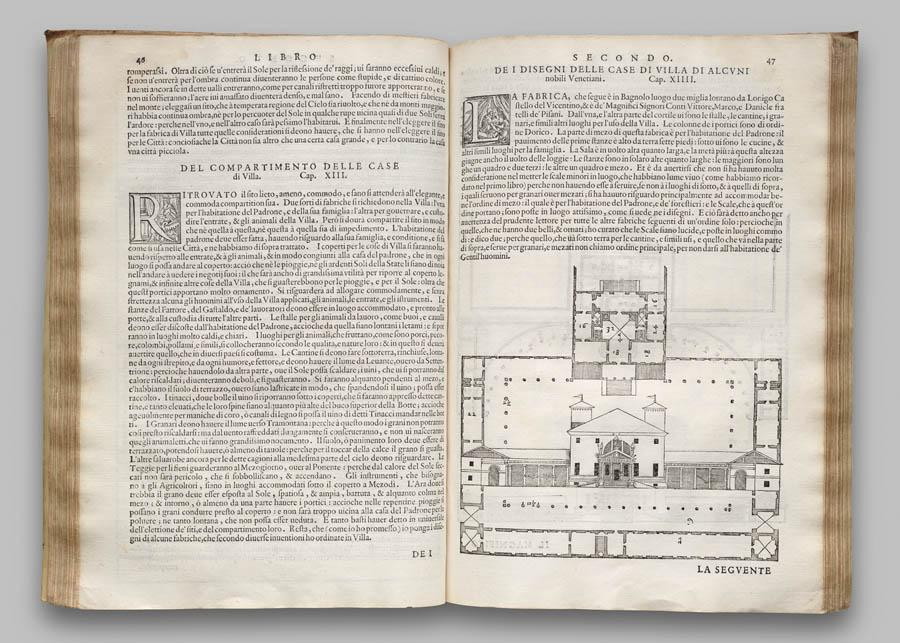
Villa Pisani (Bagnolo) in I Quattro Libri dell'Architettura

1. Walls — parametric formula
2. Ceilings — parametric formula
3. Stairs — parametric formula
4. Columns — parametric object
5. Doors — parametric formula
6. Windows — parametric formula
7. Frames — parametric object
8. Roof — parametric formula
9. Details — parametric object and formula

== See also ==
- Palladian villas of the Veneto
- De architectura (10 books on architecture)
