= Villa Valmarana =

Villa Valmarana may refer to several Venetian villas which belonged to the Valmarana family:

- Villa Valmarana (Vigardolo), in Vigardolo of Monticello Conte Otto, designed in 1542 by Andrea Palladio
- Villa Valmarana (Lisiera), in Lisiera of Bolzano Vicentino, designed about 1563 by Andrea Palladio
- Villa Capra "La Rotonda" in Vicenza, designed by Andrea Palladio
- Villa Valmarana Ai Nani, in Vicenza, with frescos by Giambattista and Giovanni Domenico Tiepolo
- Villa Valmarana (Mira), in Mira along the Riviera del Brenta
- Villa Valmarana Morosini, in Altavilla Vicentina, 1724, by Francesco Muttoni
