= Valmarana family =

Family

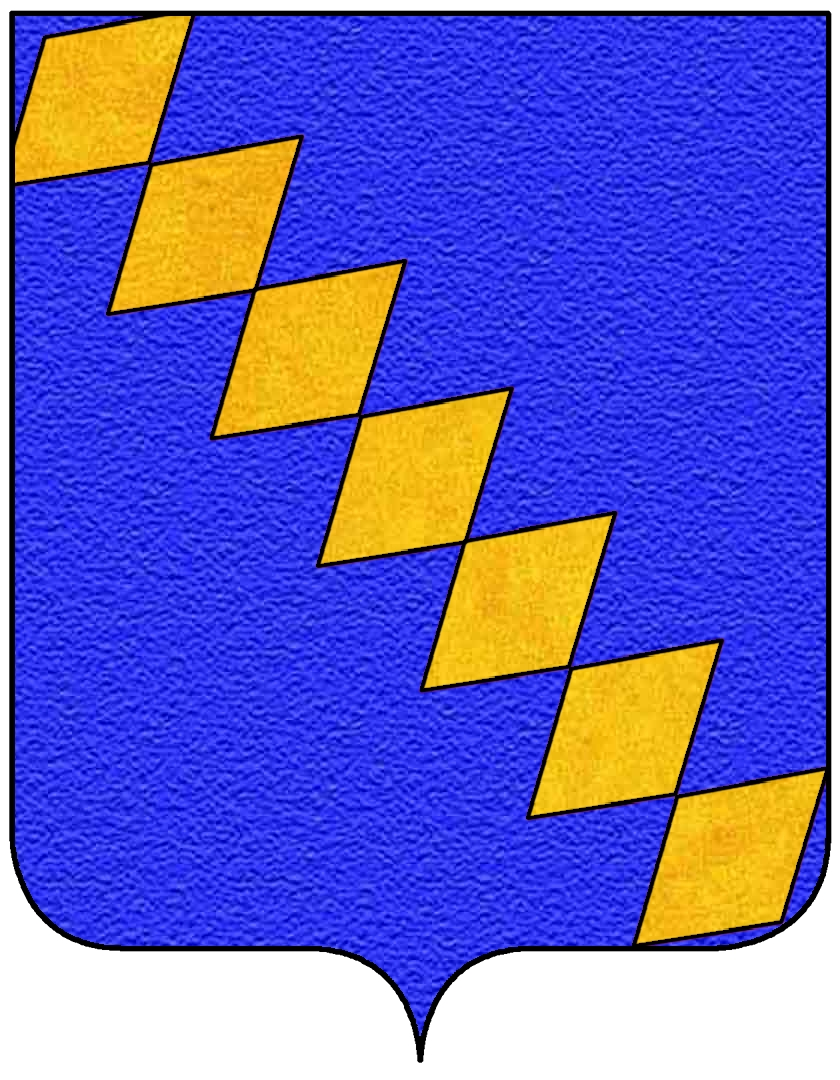
Family coat of arms

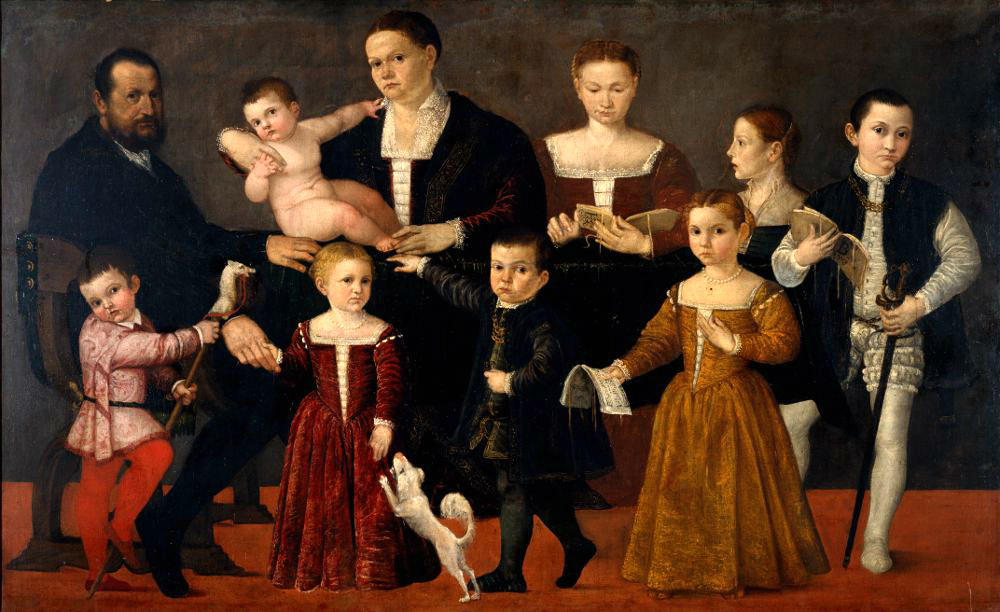
Giovanni Antonio Fasolo, Portrait of the Valmarana family (16th century), Palazzo Chiericati, Vicenza.

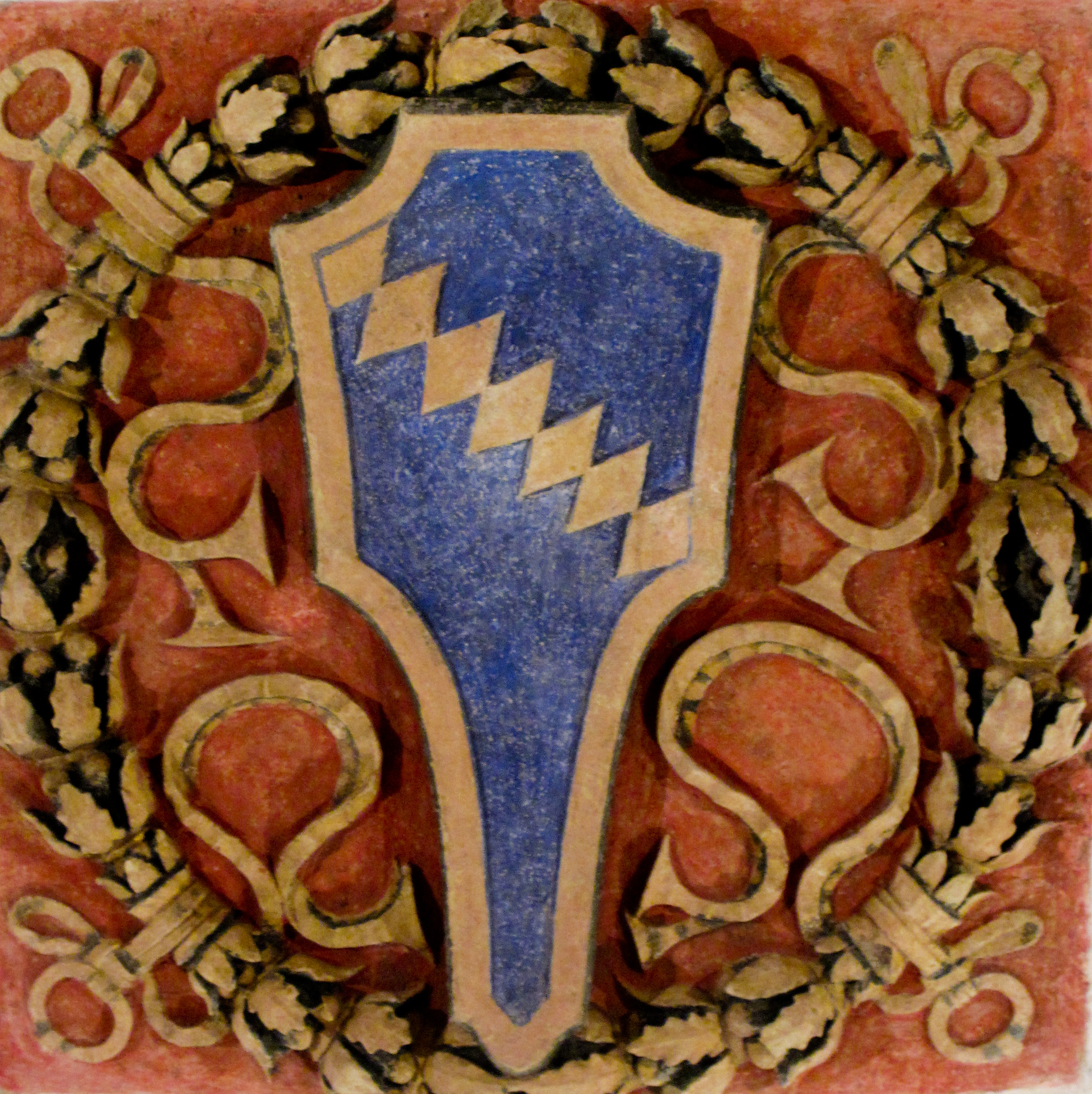
Valmarana family coat of arms in the crypt of the church of Santa Corona in Vicenza

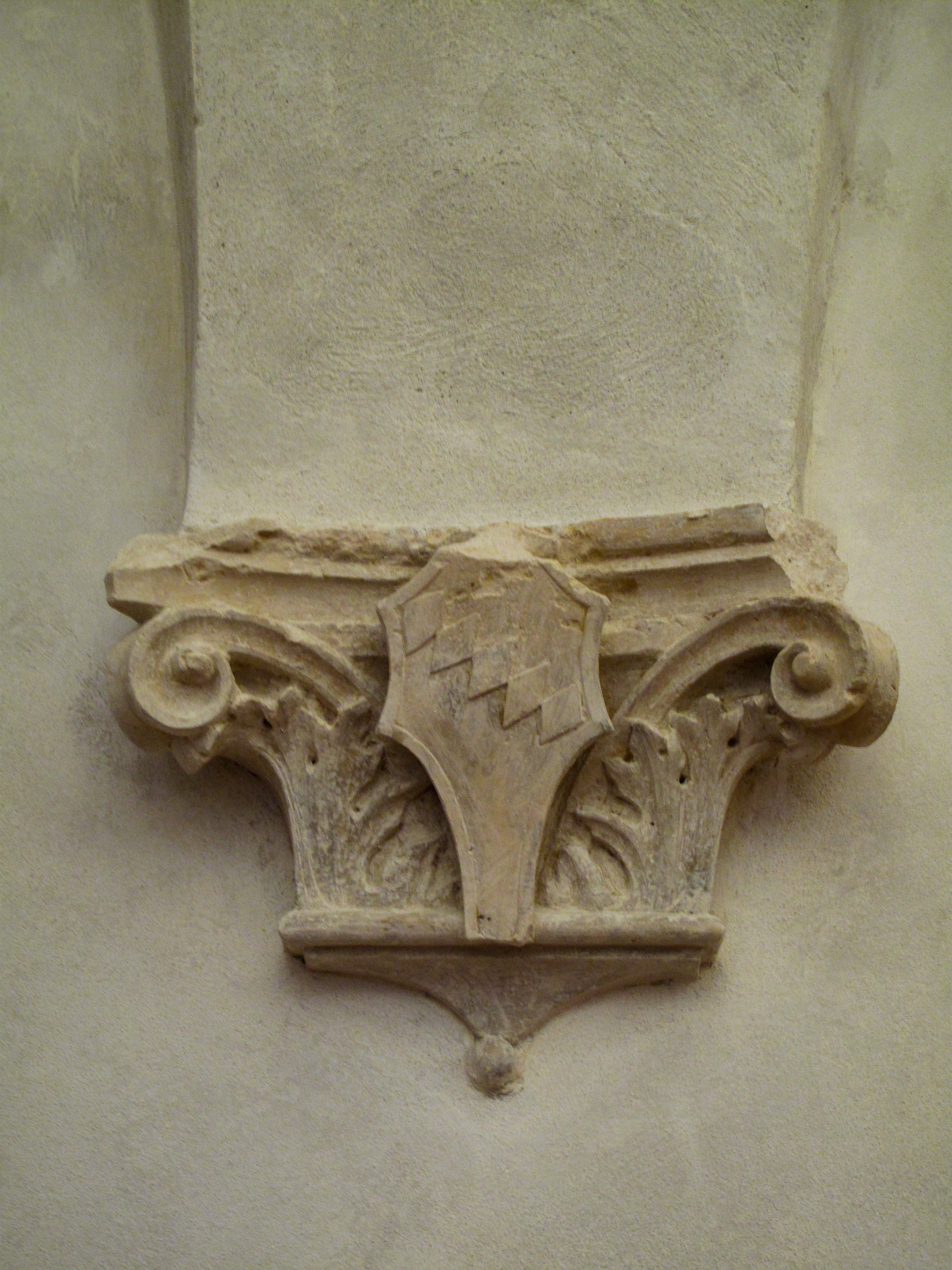
Valmarana family coat of arms in the crypt of the church of Santa Corona in Vicenza

The Valmarana family is an ancient aristocratic family in Vicenza, one branch of which also held Venetian patrician status. Its motto was "Plus Ultra" (Further). They were named after the village of Valmarana (now part of Altavilla Vicentina) in the Berici Hills, where they held fiefs from the bishop of Vicenza.

== History ==
According to a legend, the family was descended from the ancient Roman Maria gens. In 1031 they were made counts by Conrad II, Holy Roman Emperor. On 30 April 1540 Charles V, Holy Roman Emperor issued a special diploma making them counts palatine of Nogara.

Their title of count was also recognised by the Republic of Venice. In 1659 the family branch led by the brothers Triffone, Stefano and Benedetto was given Venetian patrician status after they paid 100,000 ducats to help fund the Cretan War This made them one of the 'Case fatte per soldo' (houses whose patrician position was achieved through money). Another line of the family did not join the Venetian patricians but did still sit in the Noble Council in Vicenza itself. Under the Kingdom of Lombardy–Venetia both branches were granted noble status and the rank of count of the Austrian Empire by Sovereign Resolutions on 18 December 1817, 11 March 1820 and 13 March 1825.

== Notable members ==
- Giovanni Francesco Valmarana (died 1566), made count palatine by Charles V, commissioned Andrea Palladio to design the Villa Valmarana in Lisiera
- Giovanni Alvise Valmarana, brother of Giovanni Francesco, husband of Isabella Nogarola, father of Leonardo Valmarana
- Leonardo Valmarana, husband of Isabetta Da Porto, completed the Villa Valmarana between 1579 and 1591
- Giustino Valmarana (1898-1977), Christian Democrat politician and member of the Constituent Assembly of Italy
- Mario Valmarana, professor of architecture at the University of Virginia
- Lodovico Valmarana (1926-2018), count of Valmarana and Nogara, brother of Mario, owner of the Palladian Villa Almerico Capra, known as La Rotonda

== Building projects ==
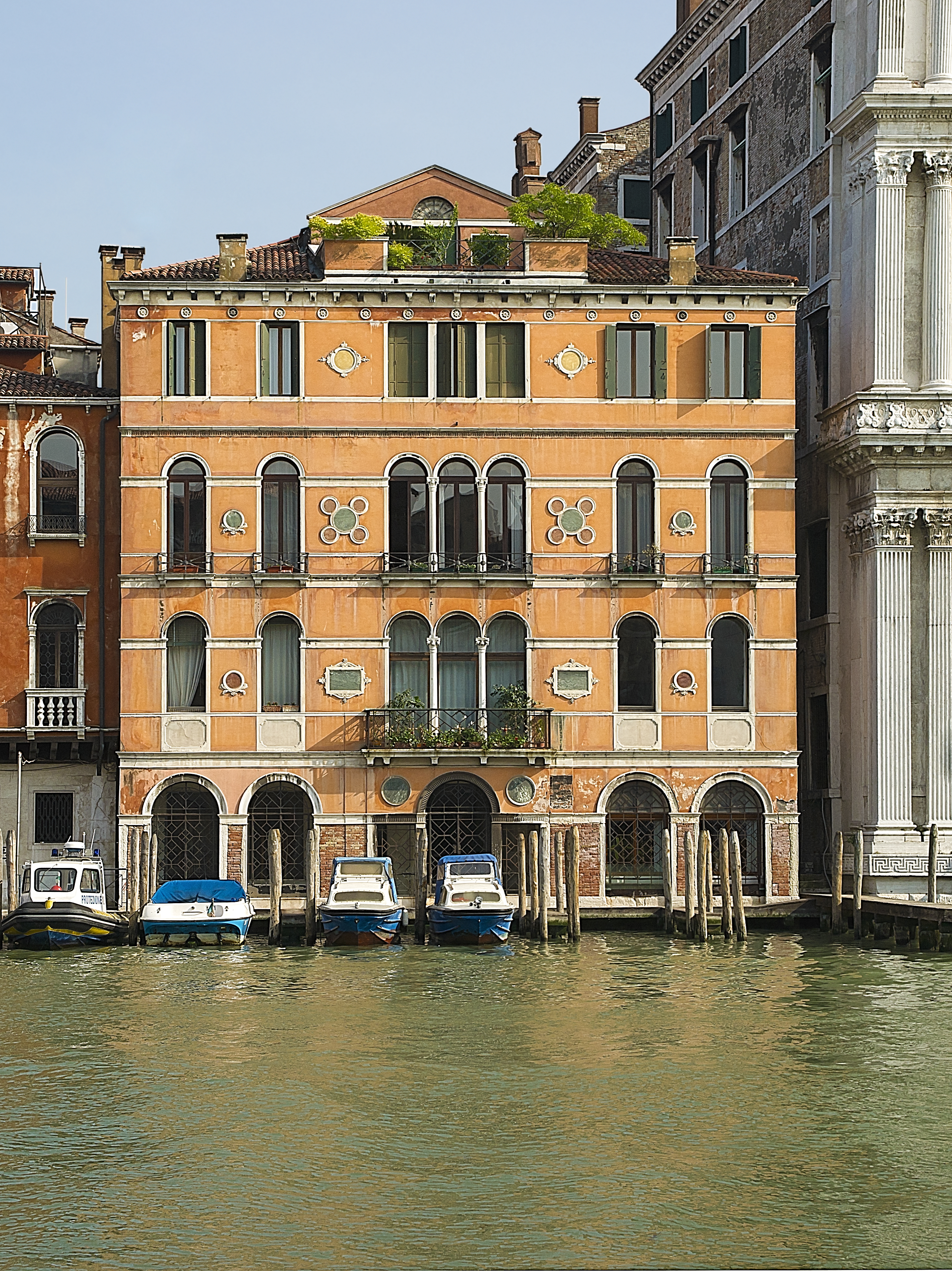
Palazzo Corner Valmarana in the San Marco quarter of Venice.

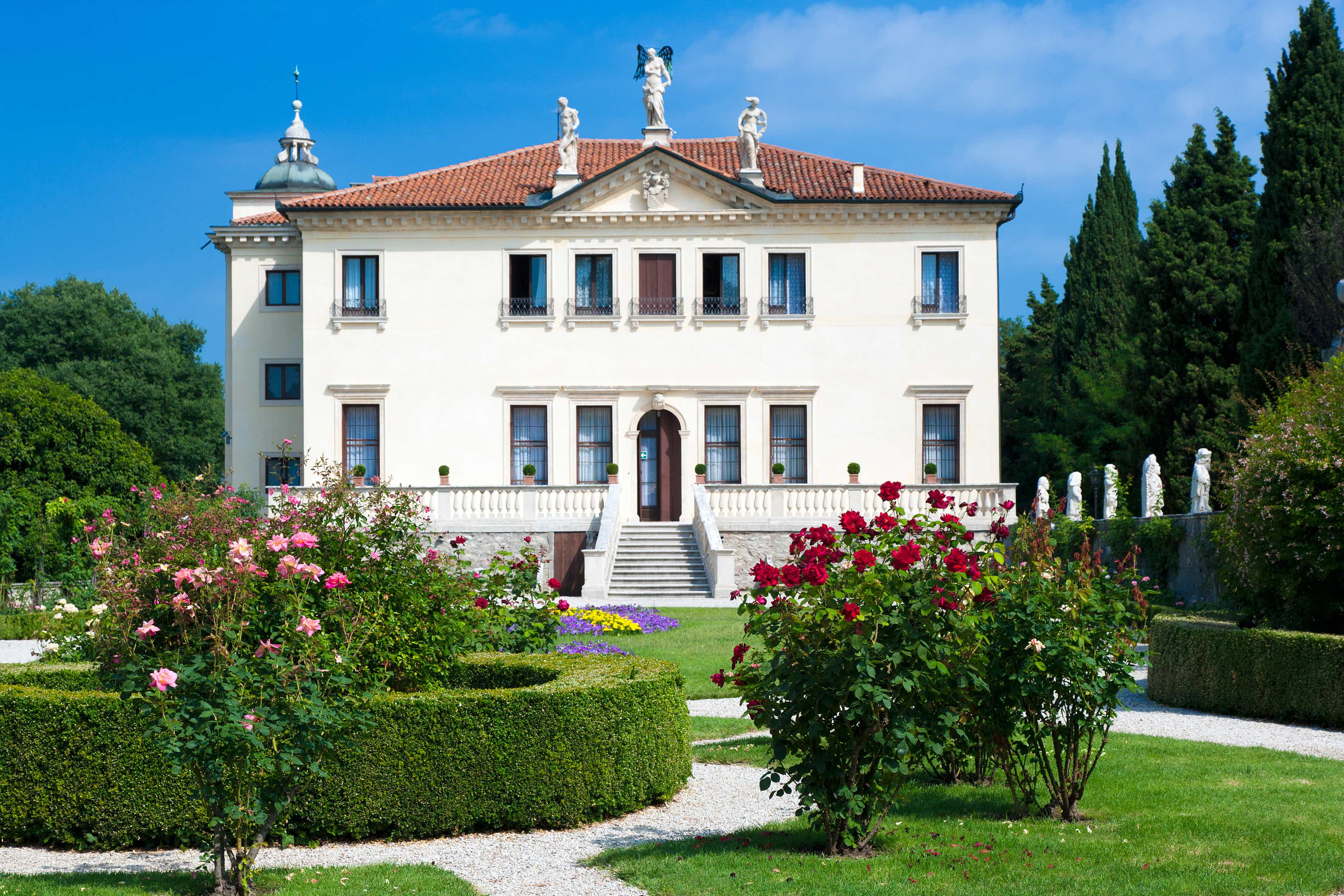
Villa Valmarana "Ai Nani", Vicenza

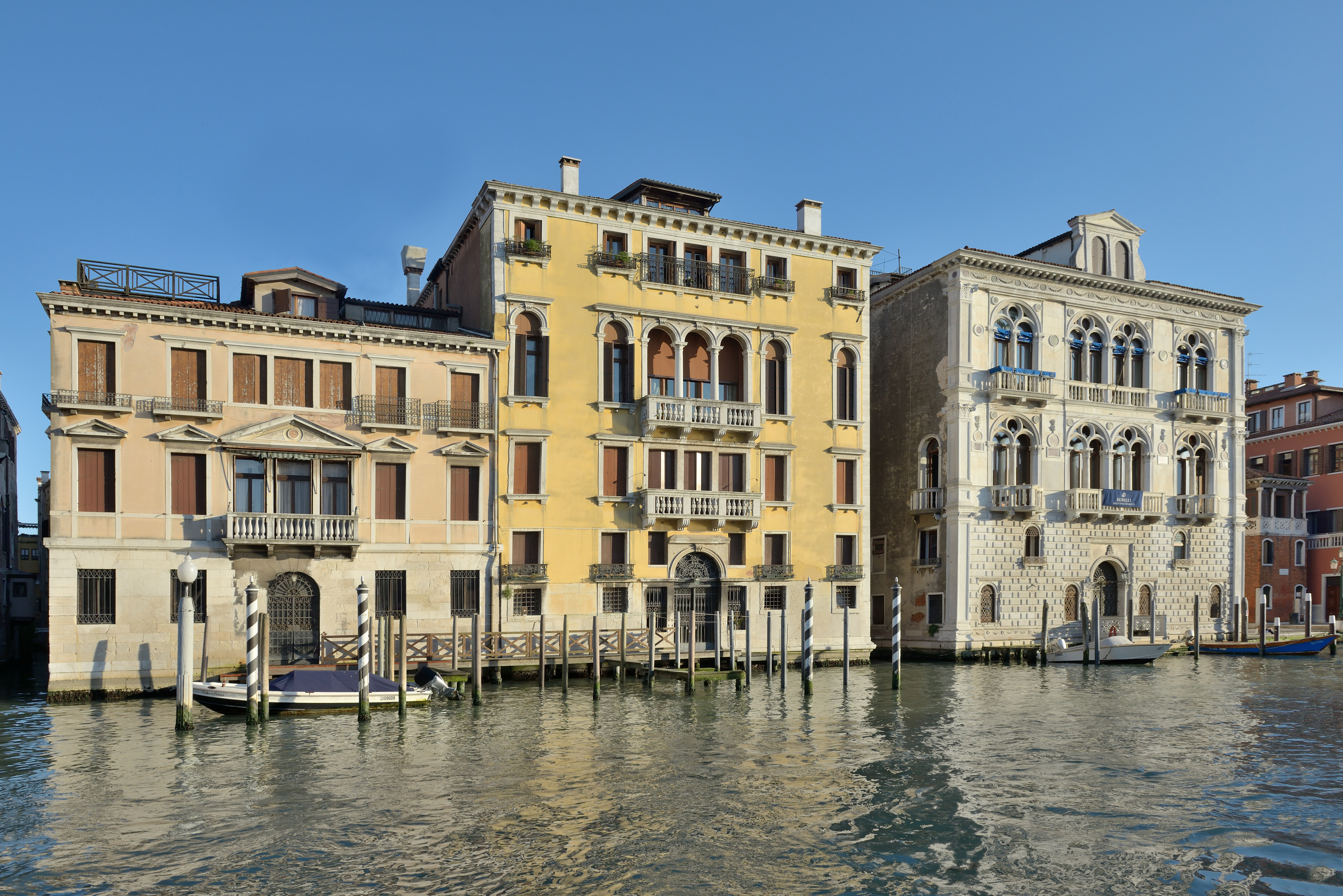
Palazzo Curti Valmarana, in San Marco

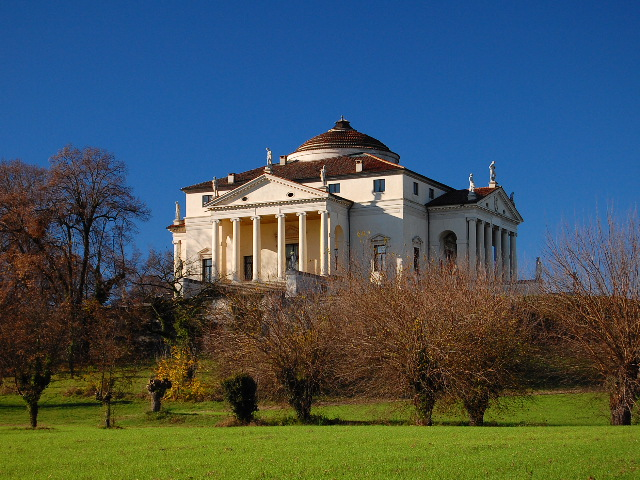
Villa Capra "La Rotonda"

=== Vicenza ===
- Valmarana Chapel, in Santa Corona, designed by Andrea Palladio
- Palazzo Valmarana, designed by Andrea Palladio
- Loggia Valmarana
- Villa Valmarana Ai Nani
- Villa Capra "La Rotonda", designed by Andrea Palladio

=== Venice ===
- Palazzo Smith Mangilli Valmarana in the Cannaregio district
- Palazzo Corner Valmarana in the San Marco district
- Palazzo Curti Valmarana, in the San Marco district

=== Other ===
- Villa Valmarana in Lisiera di Bolzano Vicentino (Vicenza), designed by Andrea Palladio
- Barchesse di villa Valmarana in Mira (Venezia) Villa Barchessa Valmarana, Mira
- Villa Valmarana in Vigardolo di Monticello Conte Otto (Vicenza), designed by Andrea Palladio
- Villa Valmarana Morosini in Altavilla Vicentina (Vicenza), designed by Francesco Muttoni.
- Villa Cittadella Vigodarzere Valmarana in Saonara - designed by Giuseppe Jappelli in 1817
