= Francesco Muttoni =

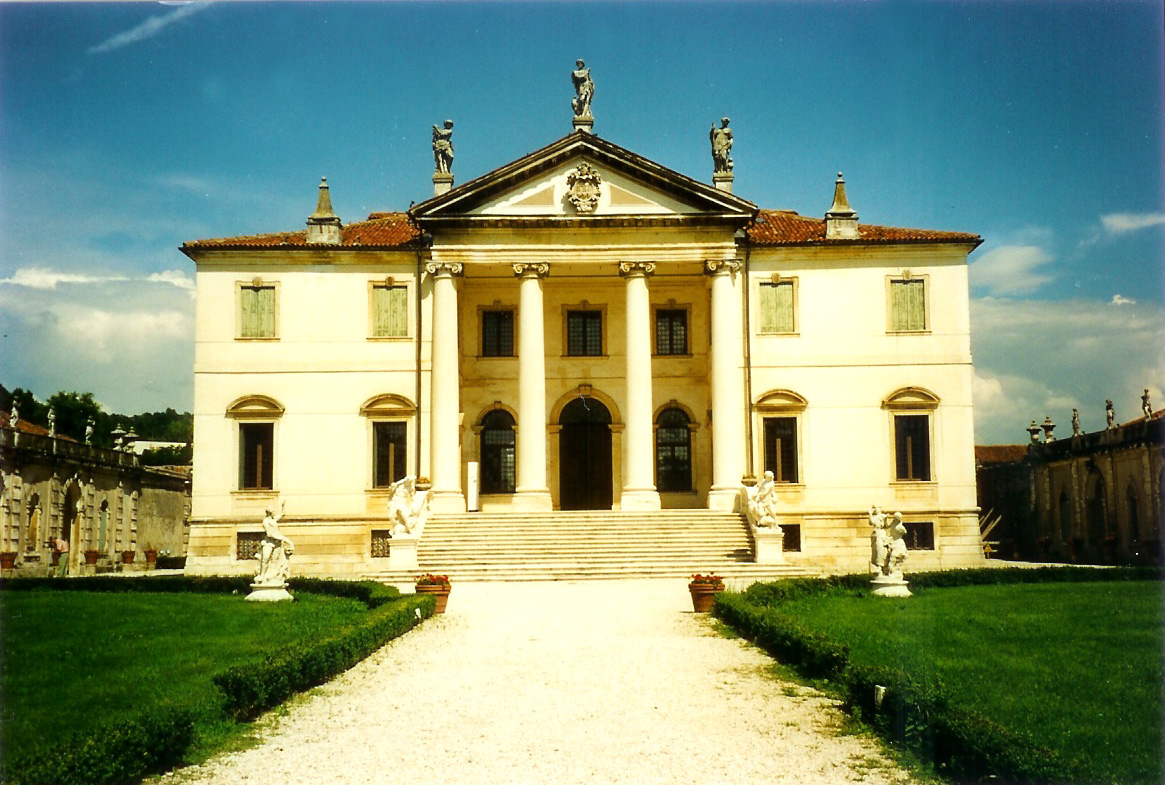
- Villa Cordellina Lombardi, Montecchio Maggiore
- Born: 22 January 1669; Porlezza, Duchy of Milan
- Died: 21 February 1747 (aged 78); Vicenza, Republic of Venice
- Occupation: Architect
- Movement: Baroque; Neoclassicism
- Buildings: Villa Valmarana ai Nani

Francesco Muttoni (January 22, 1669 – February 21, 1747) was an Italian architect, engineer, and architectural writer, mainly active near Vicenza, Italy. His work represents the transition from late Venetian Baroque to Neoclassicism, which his studies of Palladio did much to promote in its early stages. His style, however, was never entirely free of the Baroque elements acquired during his formative years. Muttoni was known to correspond closely with Lord Burlington, who built Chiswick House.

== Biography ==
=== Early life and education ===
Francesco Muttoni was born in was born in Lacima, near Porlezza, on Lake Lugano, on 22 January 1669. He was the son of a bricklayer, and in 1696 he went to work in Vicenza, as members of his family had done since the 16th century, enrolling that year in the stonemasons’ guild. In Vicenza, he was a pupil of Giovanni Battista Albanese, who in turn had trained with Vincenzo Scamozzi. From the beginning of the 18th century Muttoni was active as an expert consultant (‘perito’) and cartographer, as is exemplified by the plan of the fortifications of Vicenza that he drew in 1701 for the Venetian government (Vicenza, Archivio Storico Municipale). Throughout his life he continued to undertake various small professional commissions for surveys and on-site studies.

=== Early career ===
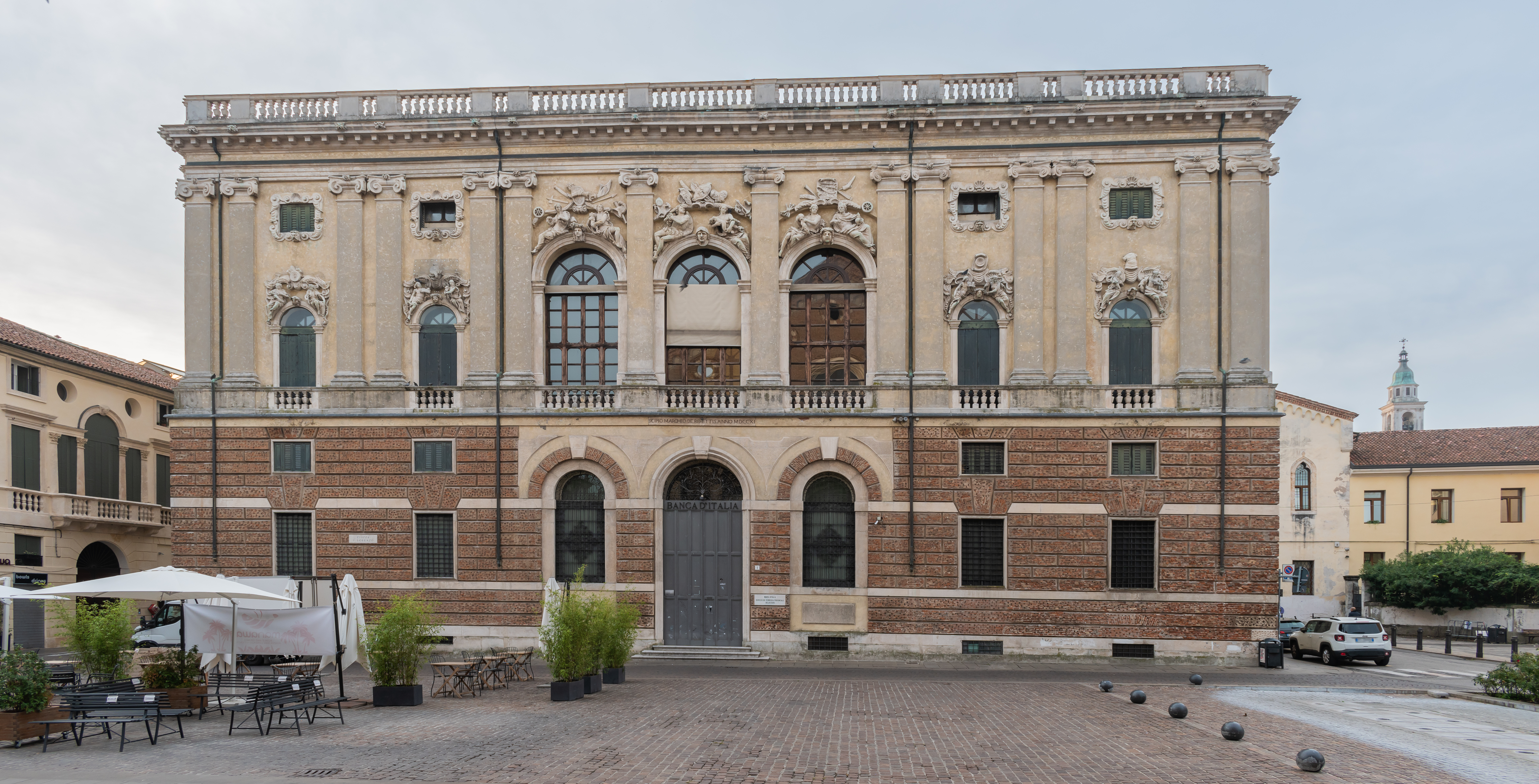
Palazzo Repeta, Vicenza.

Muttoni's first major commission was the majestic Palazzo Repeta (1701–12; now the Bank of Italy) in Piazza San Lorenzo, Vicenza, for Scipione Repeta. Its imposing façade has echoes of Michele Sanmicheli and Andrea Palladio. The rusticated ground floor characterizes many of Muttoni’s subsequent works, while the windows of the piano nobile are embellished by Baroque details at their heads. Inside is a grand staircase decorated with frescoes by Ludovico Dorigny and a sculptural group by Orazio Marinali. Around the same time Muttoni began a project (1702–27) for Benedetto Valmarana to rebuild the vast complex of the Villa Valmarana Morosini (known as La Morosina), at Altavilla Vicentina. Detailed autograph drawings of the handsome stables there are preserved at Chatsworth, Derbyshire.

The Palazzo Angarano alle Fontanelle, Vicenza, also dates from the beginning of the century (c. 1701–31), and in 1703 Muttoni designed the Biblioteca Bertoliana, Vicenza, which was built under his supervision between 1704 and 1706. The small adjacent church of San Vincenzo was also enlarged, under his guidance, with the chapel of the high altar (1704–8). In 1706 construction began on the Palazzo Velo Vettore, Vicenza, commissioned by Giacomo Velo, but work was interrupted probably by Velo’s death in 1708, and only the part between Contrà Lodi and Contrà Contorana was executed. The building was intended to be an exuberant variation of Palladio’s Palazzo Chiericati in Vicenza, ‘corrected’ by the use of an architrave in the portico and by filling in the upper loggias. The use of Baroque elements is characteristically limited to the decoration of the windows.

=== Palladio's edition ===
Engraving from Muttoni's edition of Andrea Palladio's Quattro libri

Around 1708 Thomas Twisden, an English amateur architect, commissioned from Muttoni a series of drawings of ancient monuments in Rome and Palladian buildings. In 1708 Muttoni excavated at the Colosseum and around the Arch of Constantine in Rome and surveyed a number of ancient buildings. This gave him the opportunity to verify some unpublished original drawings by Palladio of the antiquities of Rome, which he had acquired at the beginning of the century.

This was the beginning of his great task in editing Palladio’s theoretical and architectural works, which were published anonymously in eight volumes by the Venetian publisher Angelo Pasinelli in the 1740s, with fine plates engraved by the architect Giorgio Fossati (1706–78), the engraver Francesco Zucchi and others. The edition included a reprint of Palladio’s I quattro libri dell'architettura (Venice, 1570) and Muttoni’s comments, in which he stresses the differences between the actual buildings and the corresponding drawings in Palladio’s treatise, with accurate drawings of his own that provide valuable information on the state of Palladio’s buildings at the beginning of the 18th century.

Also included were the ‘unpublished buildings’ executed by Palladio in Venice and a treatise on the five orders of architecture as exemplified by ancient and modern authorities. The ninth volume, devoted to the many other ‘unpublished buildings’ attributed to Palladio and edited by Giorgio Fossati, was not published until 1760. The preparatory drawings for the tenth volume, which was never printed, include works by architects following Palladio and plans by Muttoni himself. Muttoni also published in 1741 a smaller version of the volume on the five orders of architecture, which was a more convenient manual for professionals.

=== Later work ===
On returning from Rome, Muttoni resumed his architectural work. He planned a grandiose royal palace with a square floor plan surrounding a circular court surmounted by a dome for Frederick IV of Denmark, who was in Vicenza at the end of 1708. Between 1708 and 1710 he laid out with great sensitivity the vast complex of buildings and gardens of Villa Fracanzan at Orgiano, Vicenza, for Giovanni Battista Fracanzan, and around this time he was also working on the magnificent stables of the Villa Porto Colleoni at Thiene, Vicenza, both of which projects included statues by Orazio Marinali.

In 1709 he was appointed ‘Architect and Public Surveyor’ of Vicenza, and he proceeded to draw up a plan (1713; unexecuted, Biblioteca Civica Bertoliana) for the redevelopment of the Campo Marzo area of the city to accommodate a new site for the annual fair. In 1712, for Ottavio and Giuseppe Trento, Muttoni produced the first drawings for the Palazzo Trento Valmarana, Vicenza, which was built under his continuous supervision (1713–17). This palazzo, which is considered his masterpiece, reveals Muttoni’s ability to experiment, notably in the façade overlooking the garden, where Baroque detailing is again used at the windows.

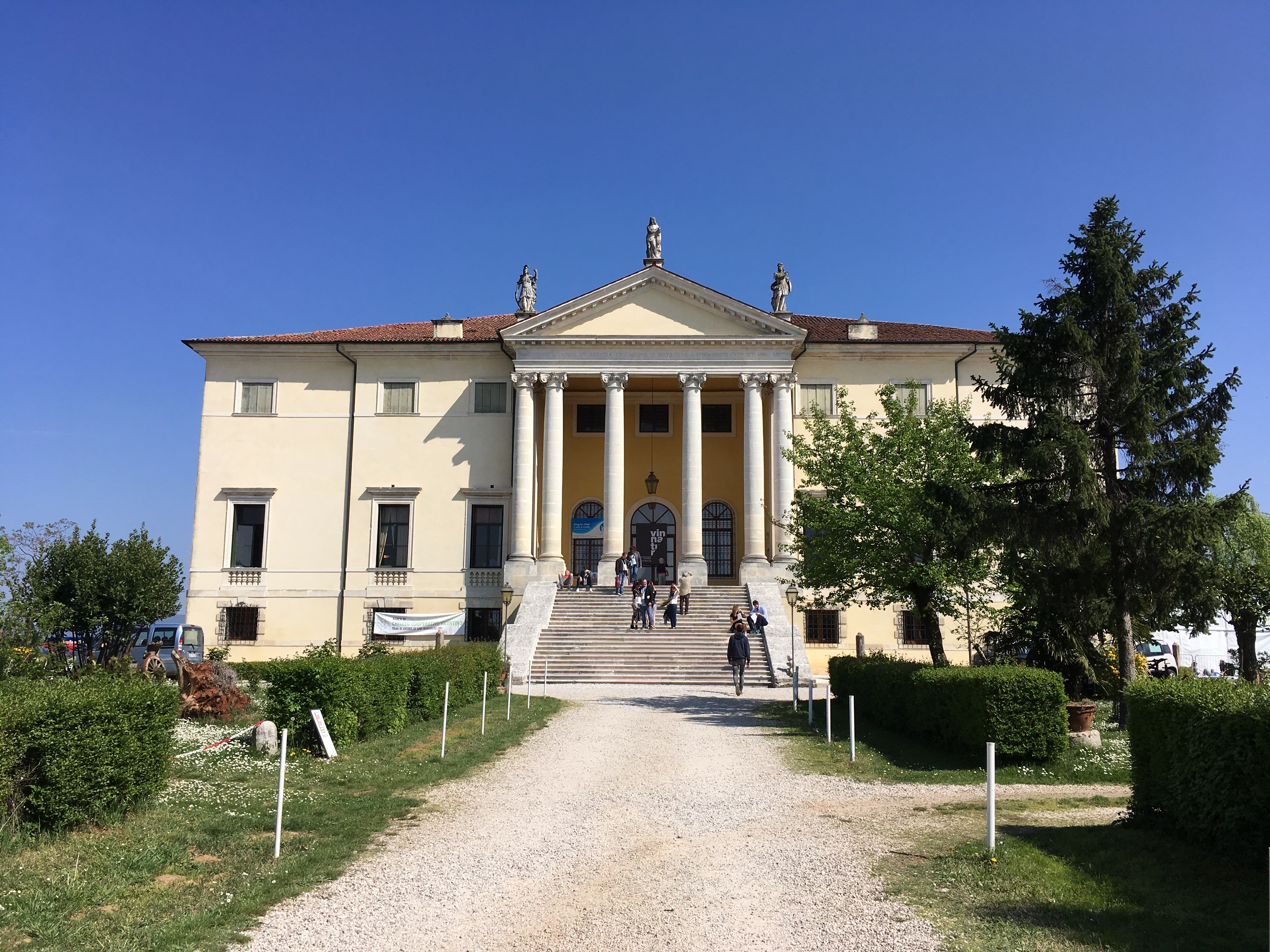
Villa Da Porto, Monticello di Fara

Muttoni is also credited with a design of a radically different style for the simple and harmonious Villa Da Porto (1714–15), known as La Favorita, in Monticello di Fara, Vicenza, which is designed on Palladian lines, with a slightly projecting porch and paired Ionic columns, and he worked in 1717–18 on the country estates of the Trento family at Costozza di Longare, Vicenza. His subsequent skilful planning (1718–46) of the avenues, courts, belvederes, ponds, parterres and gates in the two Trissino villas, Vicenza, constitutes one of the most important landscaping projects in the Veneto and further confirmed his reputation as a landscape designer.

Muttoni also worked on a number of Palladio’s villas: at the Villa La Rotonda, Vicenza, between 1725 and 1740, he transformed the third floor into small rooms suitable for living space; early in the 18th century he extended the Villa Thiene Valmarana at Quinto Vicentino, of which he possessed Palladio’s original drawing; and in the Villa Pojana at Pojana Maggiore, Vicenza, he created a new wing of the building with a corner turret for the stairs (before 1740).

Muttoni also carried out numerous minor projects in churches and convents in Vicenza and the surrounding area, and he executed the parish churches of Rossano Veneto (1746), Vicenza, and of Leffe (1767) in Val Seriana, Bergamo. Another important, and controversial, late work was the Portici di Monte Berico (1746–c. 1778) in Vicenza, a long passage covered by simple, severe arches, running uphill from the city to the sanctuary of the Madonna. Muttoni published an essay on the subject in 1741, but in 1746, as construction work was beginning, the project was opposed by the Vicenza academic and architect Enea Arnaldi (1716–94). Appeal was made to the judgement of the Paduan scientist Giovanni Poleni, who ruled in favour of Muttoni’s plan.

Many other buildings in and around Vicenza are referred or provisionally attributed to Muttoni, who at his death left his books, manuscripts, prints, drawings and drawing instruments (all now in Porlezza, Archivio Comunale) to his native town for the use of architectural students.

== Works ==
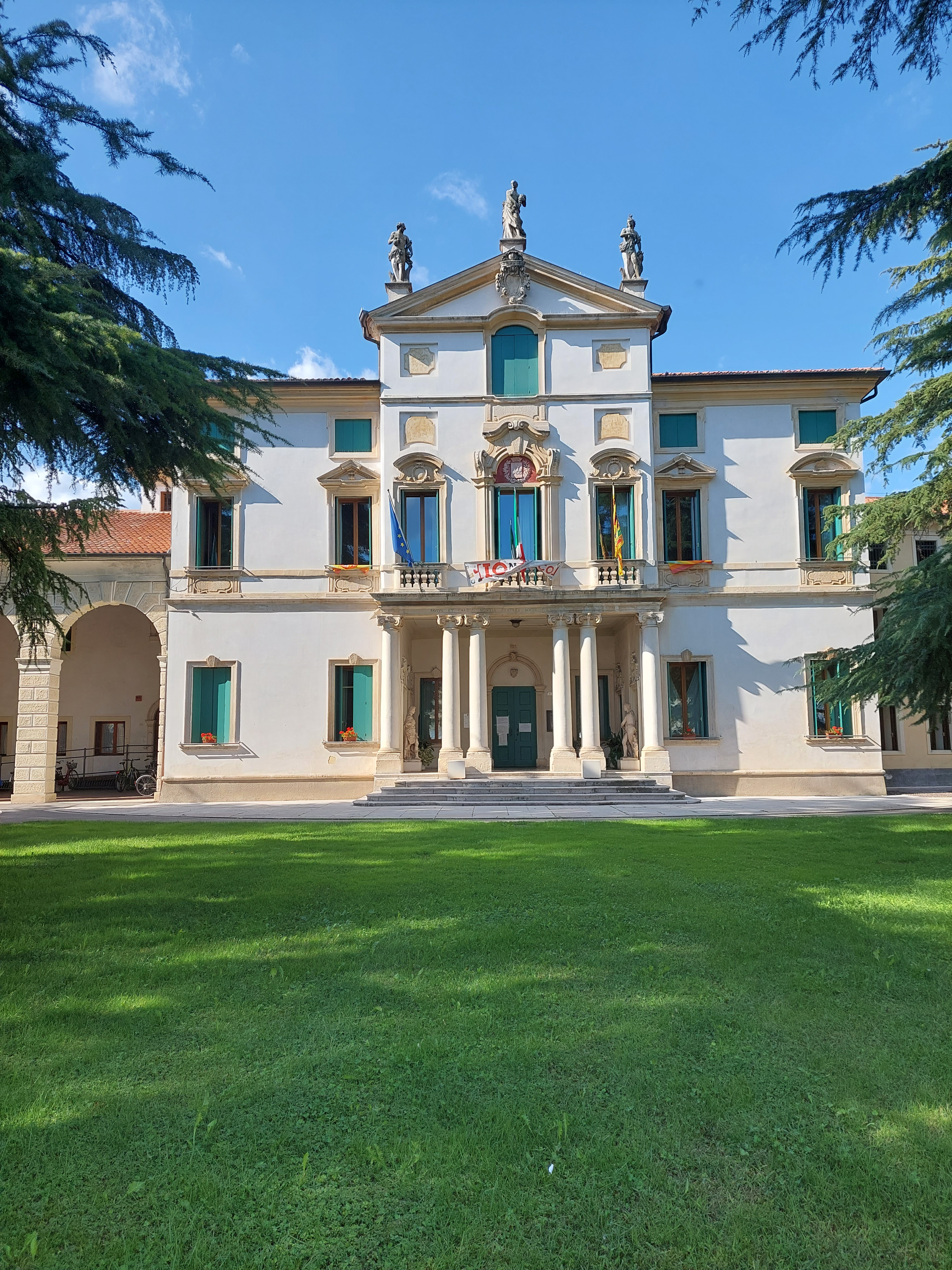
Villa Monza, Dueville

Among his works, mainly in Vicenza were the following :

- Palazzo della pubblica biblioteca
- Palazzo Repeta in piazza San Lorenzo (now Bank of Italy)
- Palazzo dei Velo in contrà Lodi
- Palazzo dei Valmarana a S. Faustino e in Borgo Berga
- Porticoes leading to the Basilica di Santa Maria di Monte Berico
- Palazzo di Monte di Pieta, Vicenza (facade)
- Villa Fracanzan Piovene a Orgiano (1710)
- Villa Da Porta La Favorita at Brendola (1714-1715)
- Villa Valmarana Morosini ad Altavilla Vicentina (1724)
- Palazzo Trento-Valmarana (1717)
- Capella Thiene in the church of Santa Corona, Vicenza (1725)
- Villa Valmarana ai Nani
- Villa Loschi Zileri dal Verme
- Villa Monza (1715) a Dueville
- Villa Checcozzi (1717) a San Tomio di Malo
- Villa Trento (1717–18) di Costozza
- Villa Cerchiari (1722) a Isola Vicentina
- Villa Capra (1728) a Santa Maria di Camisano
- Villa Negri (1708)
- Gardens of Villa Trissino at Trissino
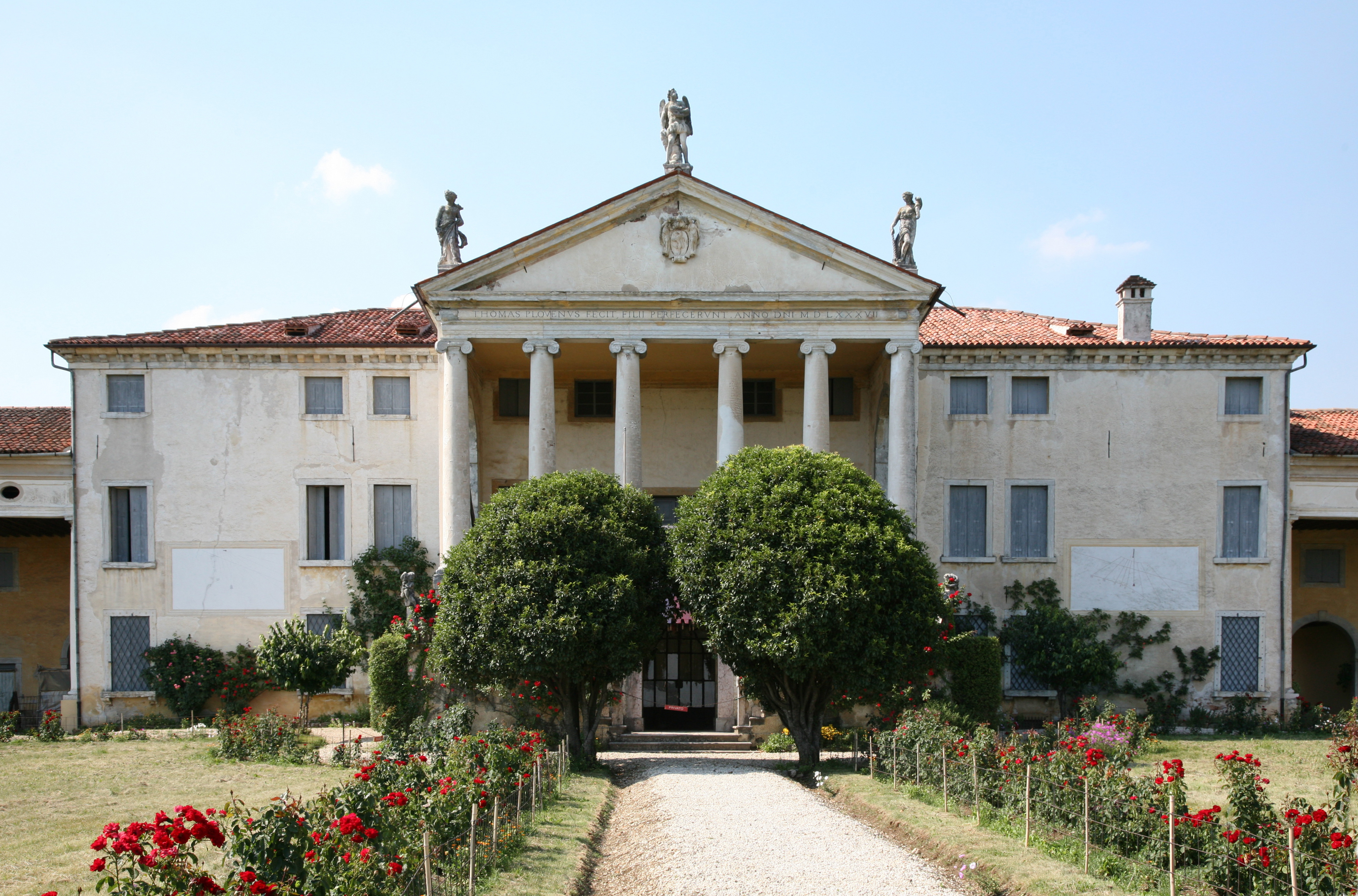
Villa Piovene, Lonedo di Lugo di Vicenza, Italy

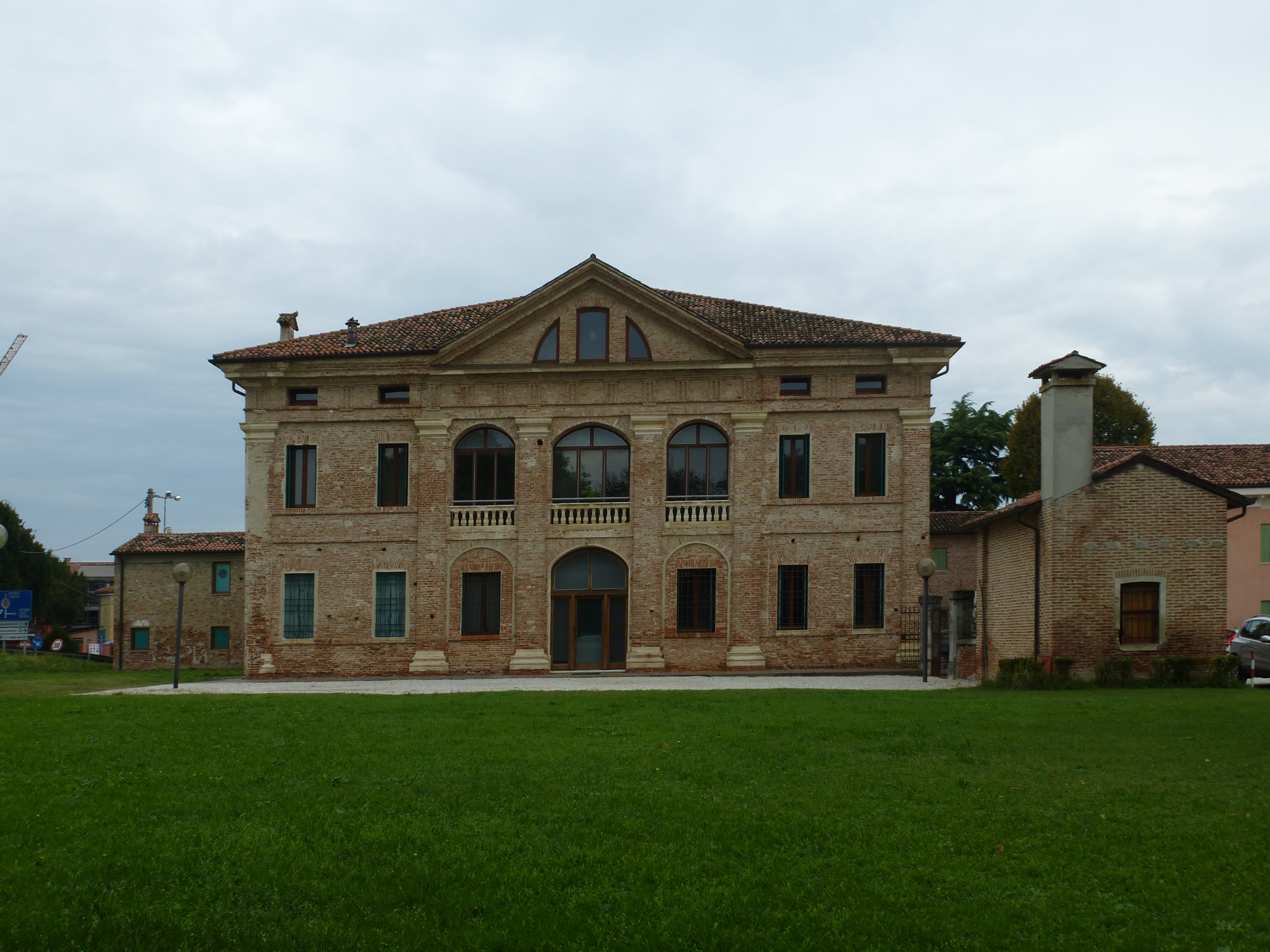
Villa Thiene, Quinto Vicentino

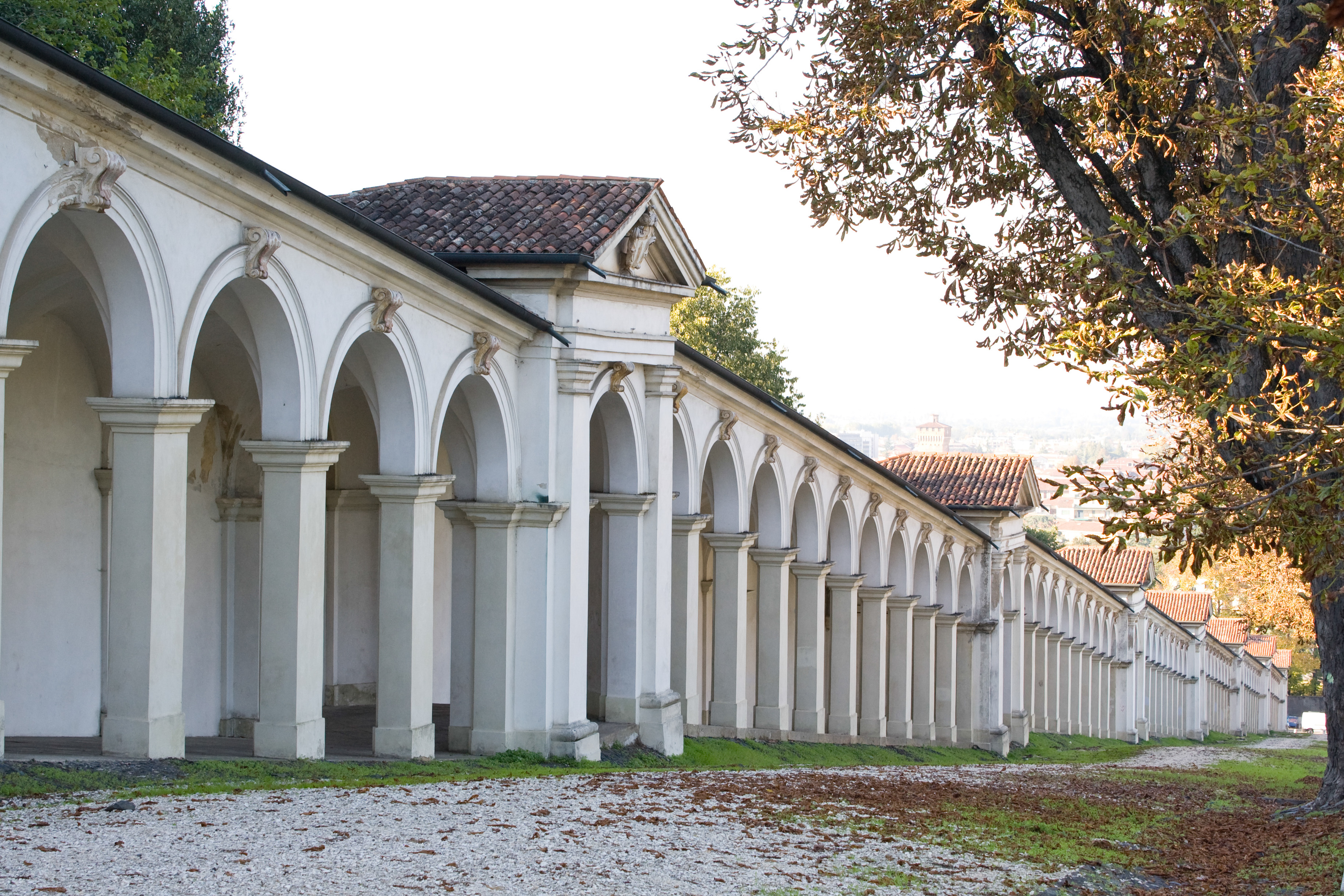
Portici di Monte Berico

== Bibliography ==
- Barausse, Manuela (2012). "MUTTONI, Francesco". Dizionario Biografico degli Italiani (in Italian). Vol. 77: Morlini–Natolini. Rome: Istituto dell'Enciclopedia Italiana. ISBN 978-88-12-00032-6.
- Barbieri, Franco (1980). "I disegni di Francesco Muttoni a Chatsworth". Arte Lombarda. 55/56/57: 219–235. JSTOR 43105631.
- Wittkower, Rudolf; Connors, Joseph; Montagu, Jennifer (1999). Art and Architecture in Italy, 1600-1750. Vol. 3. New Haven, CT: Yale University Press. ISBN 978-0300079418.
