= Loggia Valmarana =

UNESCO World Heritage Site
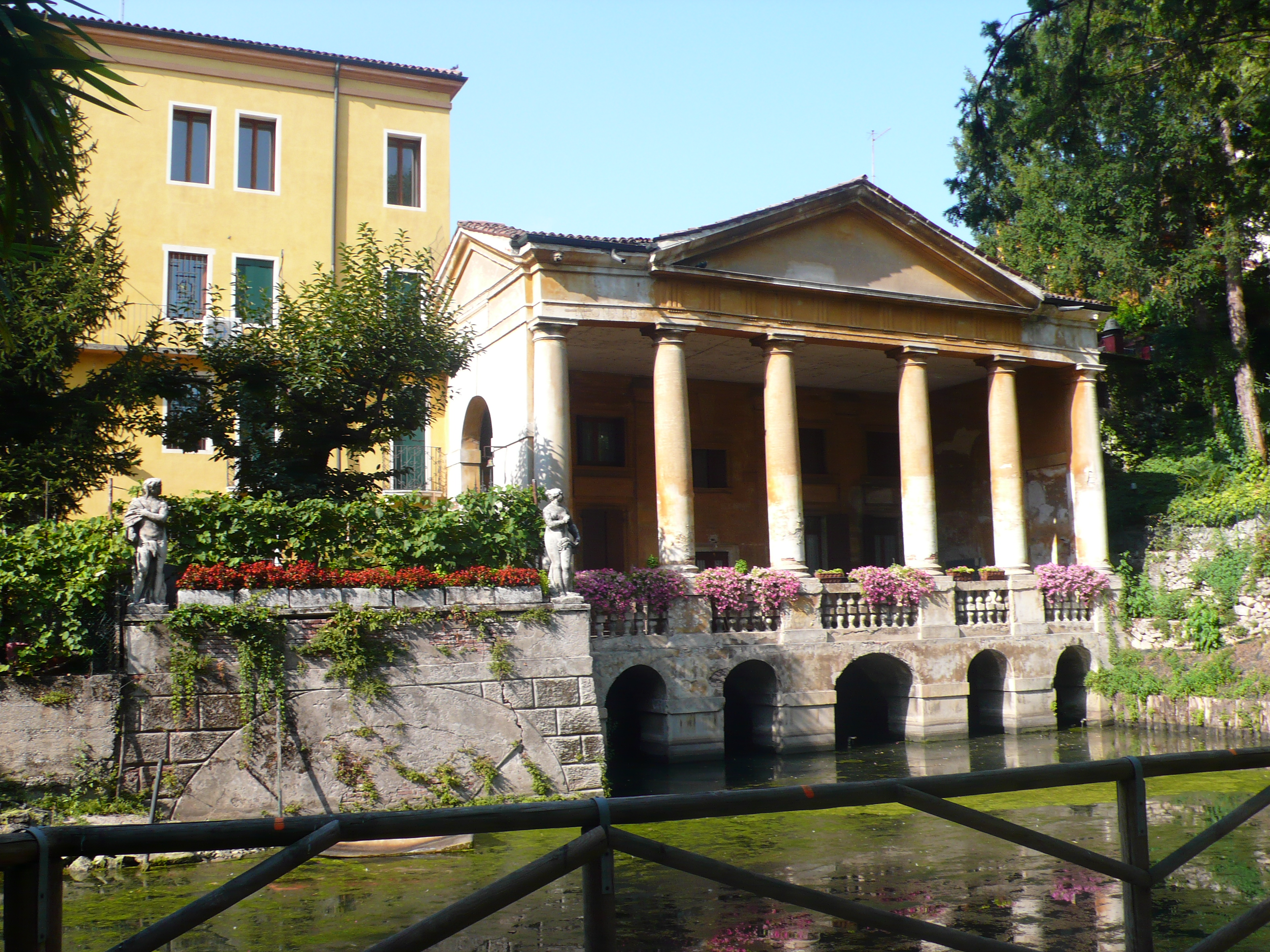

- Location within Veneto Location within Italy
- Location: Vicenza, Province of Vicenza, Veneto, Italy
- Part of: City of Vicenza and the Palladian Villas of the Veneto
- Criteria: Cultural: (i)(ii)
- Reference: 712bis-001
- Inscription: 1994 (18th Session)
- Coordinates: 45°32′49″N 11°32′25″E

The Loggia Valmarana located inside the Salvi gardens, also called Valmarana Salvi gardens, was probably built in 1591 by a student of Andrea Palladio by the will of Gian Luigi Valmarana himself, who wanted this place become a meeting point between intellectuals and academics.

Since 1994 it is part of the City of Vicenza and the Palladian Villas of the Veneto forming the World Heritage Site of the Unesco.

== History ==
The gardens were opened in 1592 by Leonardo Valmarana (date and name are displayed in the Loggia Valmarana) and covered the area bounded by the extension of the Corso Palladio and the course of the Seriola Canal, ditch that since the opening was equipped with a bridge of wood that would allow crossing. Open to the public at the behest of Leonardo, they were later closed for a couple of centuries.

Inside the park, on the west side, there is also the Lombard loggia of the seventeenth century, with three arches, built by Baldassarre Longhena. In the nineteenth century the park was transformed into an English garden and, only from the following century, it was reopened to the public.

== Gallery ==
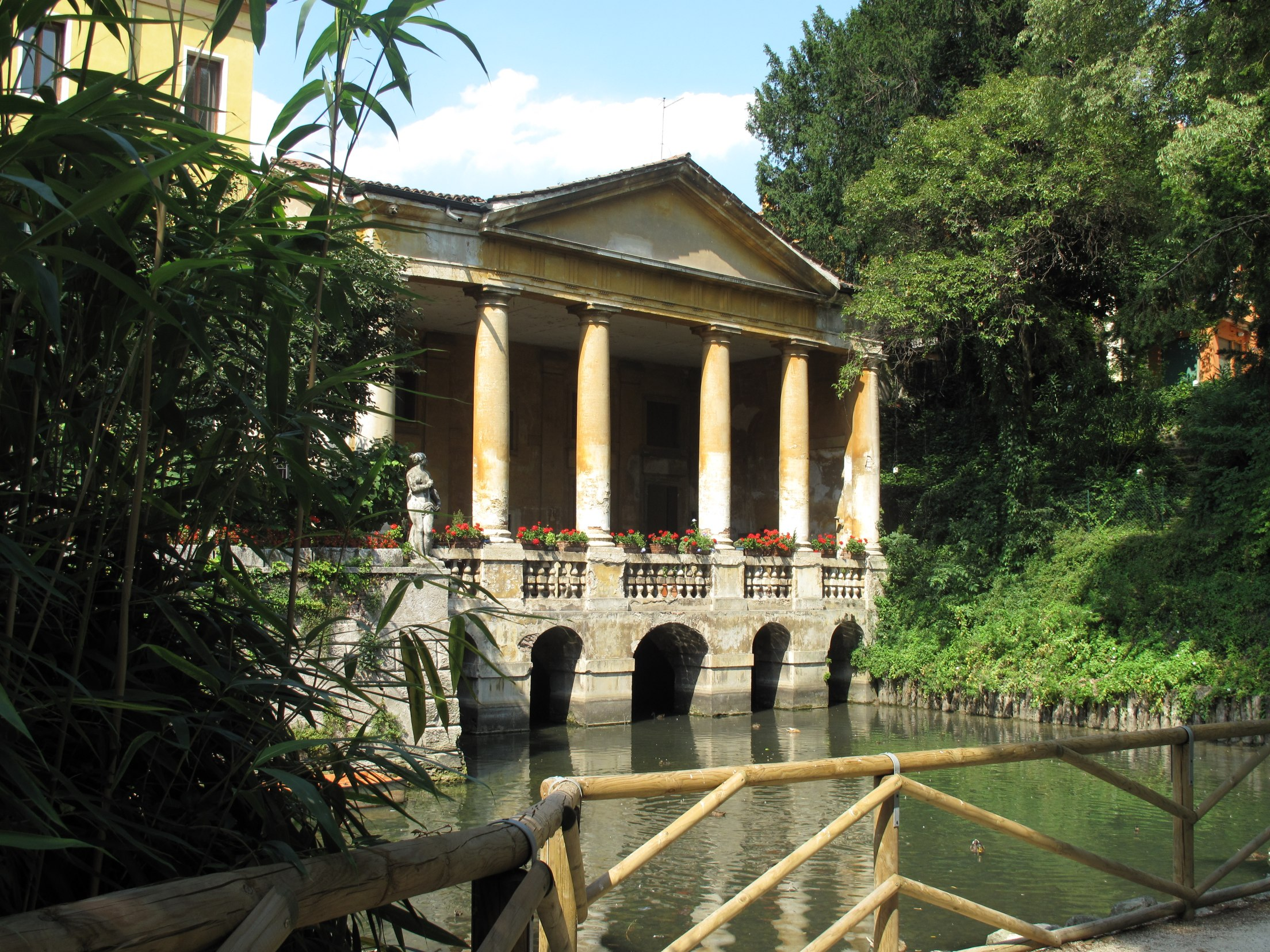
Approach to Loggia Valmarana from the water

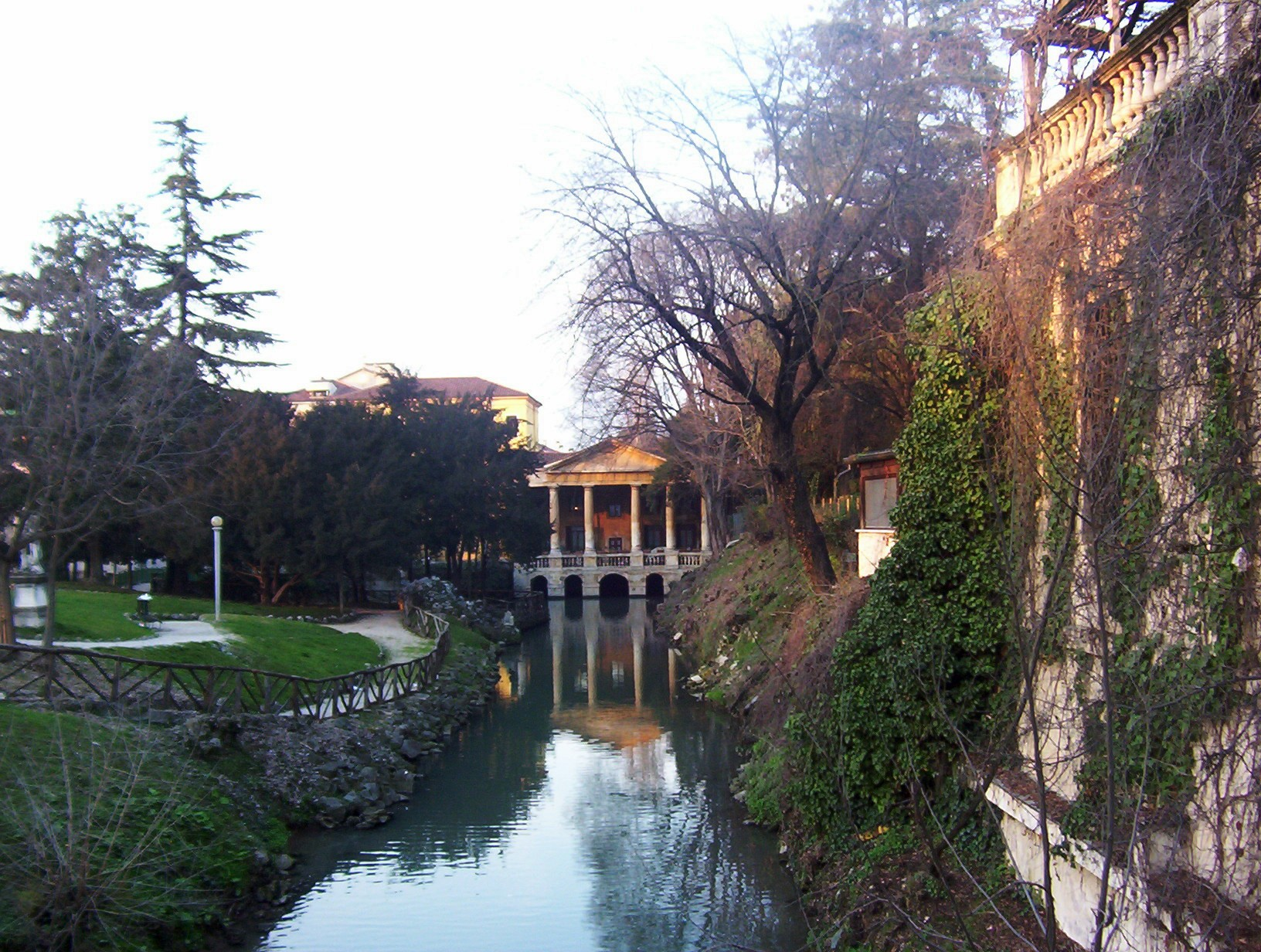
The Loggia and the Garden Salvi on the left

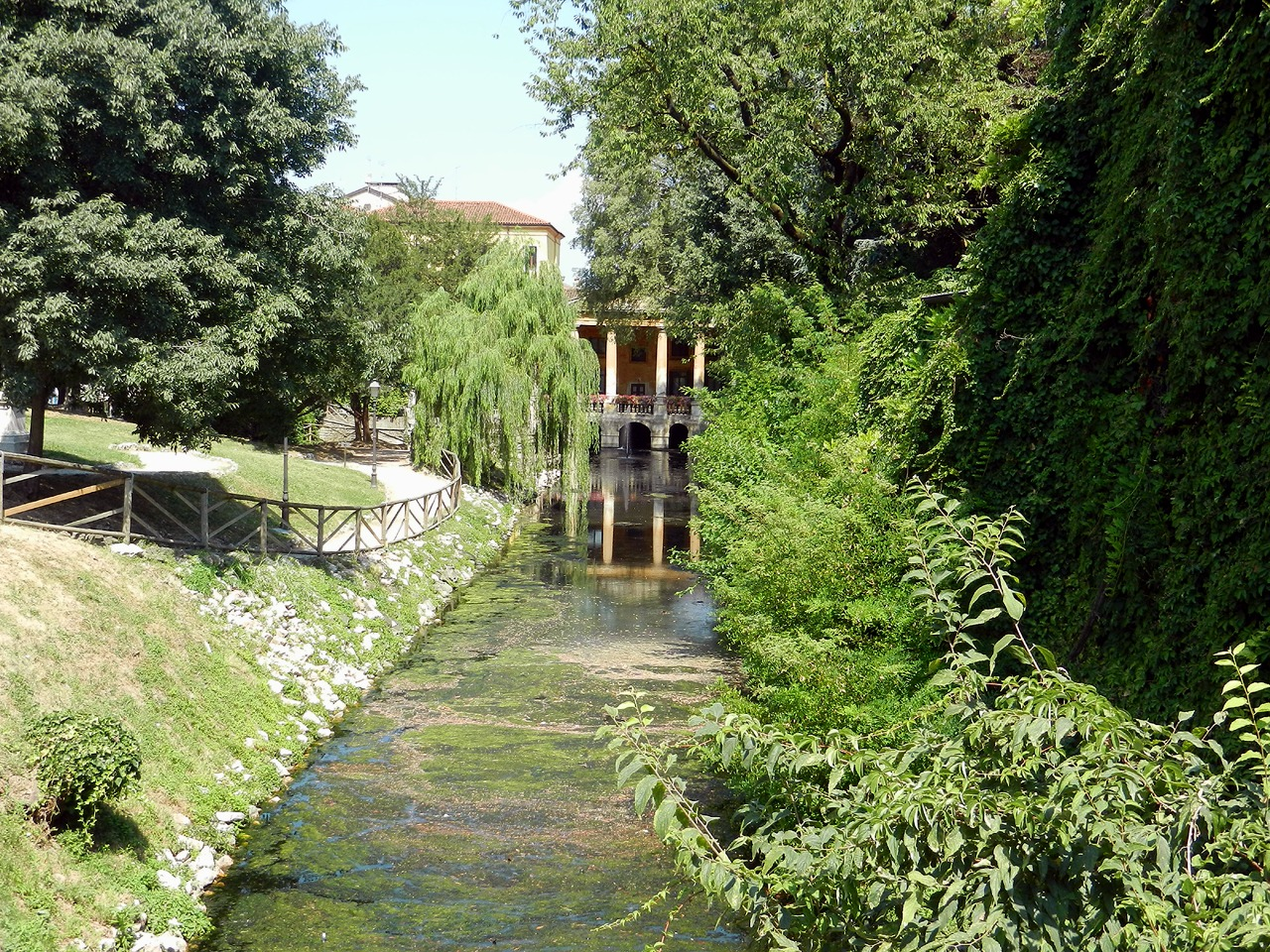
Vicenza - Valmarana Lodge in the Salvi Gardens

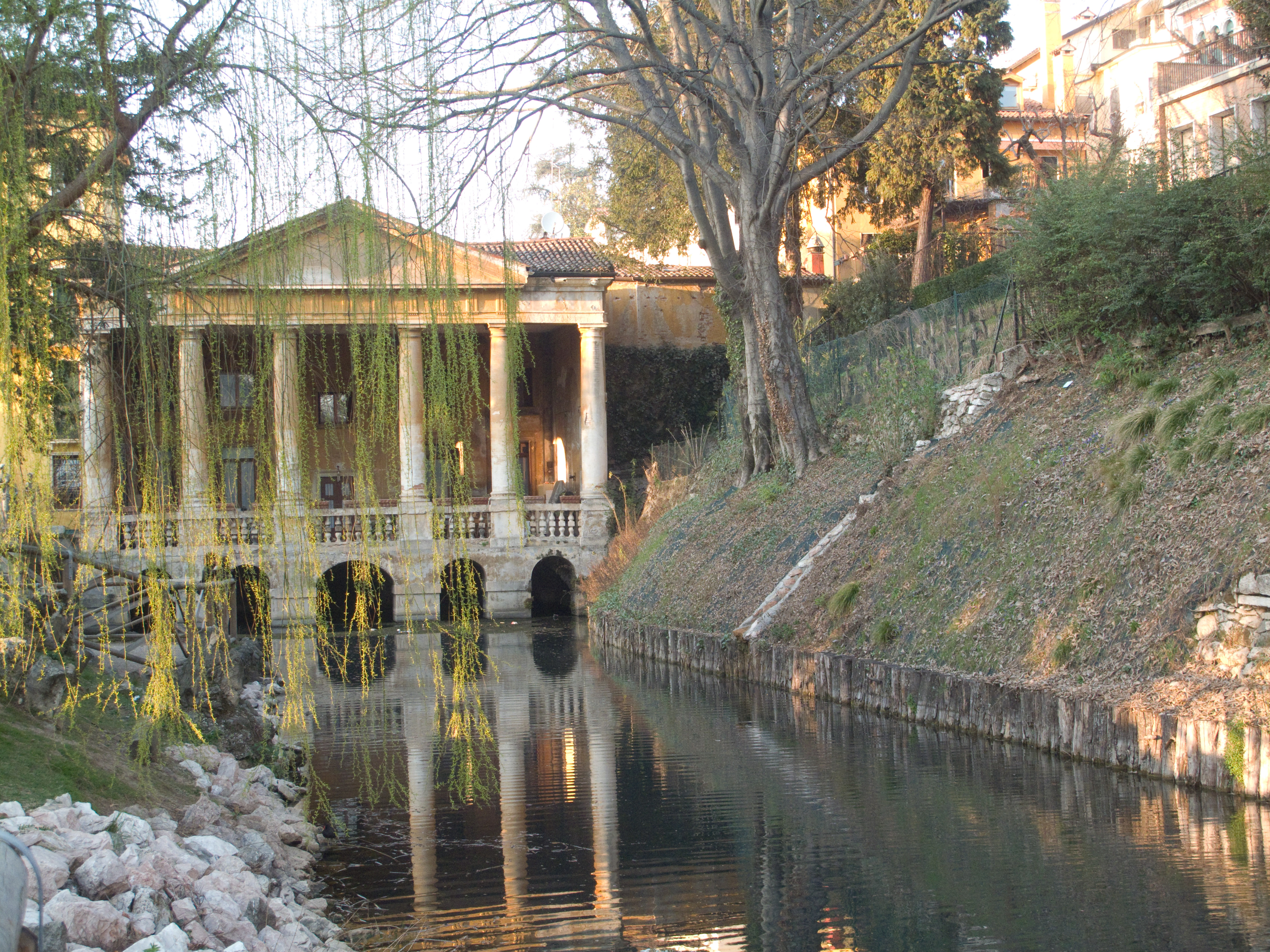
The Valmarana Lodge is reflected in the Seriola Roggia at the Salvi Gardens

== See also ==
- Valmarana Chapel, in Santa Corona, designed by Andrea Palladio
- Palazzo Valmarana
- Villa Valmarana (Lisiera)
- Valmarana family
