= Palazzo Curti Valmarana =

Coordinates: 45.44°N 12.33°E

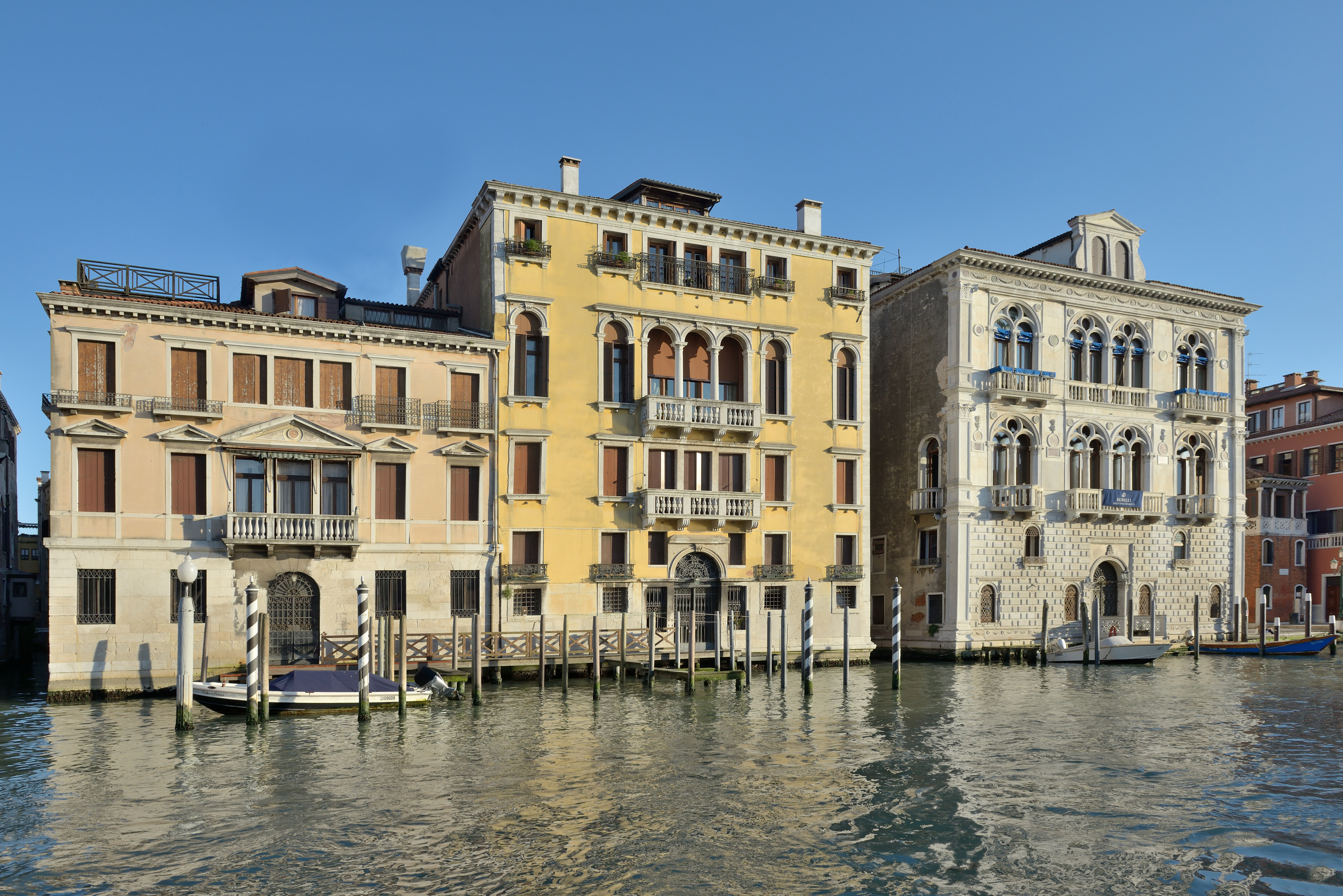
The palace Curti Valmarana between Ca' Michiel on the left and palace Corner Spinelli

The Palazzo Curti Valmarana is a Renaissance-style palace located in the Grand Canal of Venice, Italy. It is nestled between Palazzo Querini Benzon and Palazzo Corner Spinelli in the San Marco district. Directly across the canal, it faces Palazzo Querini Dubois.

== History ==
It is a 17th-century building, but renovated in the 18th-century.

The Valmarana family, an aristocratic lineage from Vicenza with ties to Venetian patrician status, is associated with the palace. They derive their name from the village of Valmarana in the Berici Hills, where they held fiefs from the bishop of Vicenza.

== Architecture ==
The first floor features architraves, while the second floor features a squared arch. The facade opens to the center with overlapping three-light windows, flanked by single lads.

== See also ==
- Valmarana family
