= Villa Valmarana (Vigardolo) =

Coordinates: 45°36′26.50″N 11°35′4″E

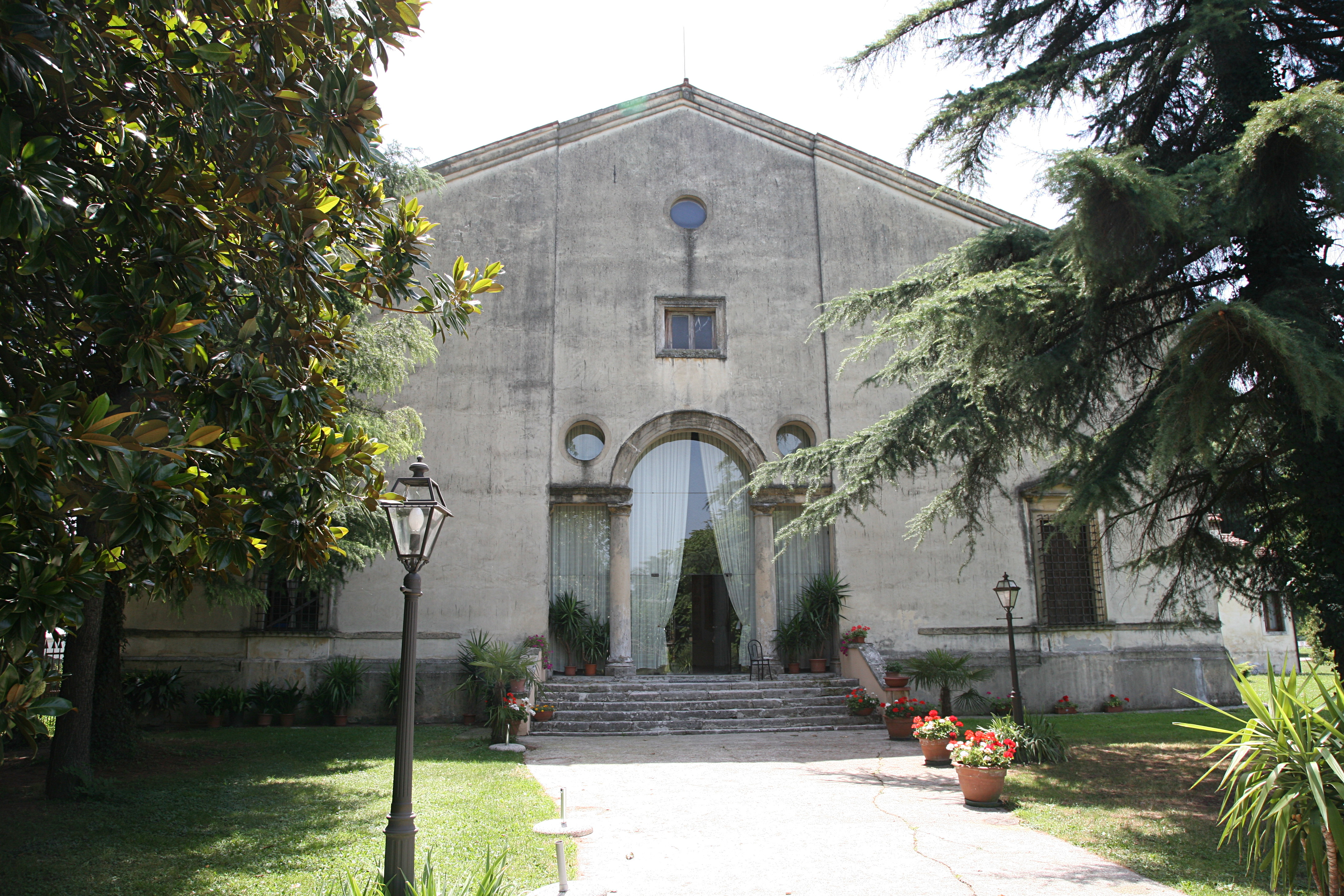
Villa Valmarana in Vigardolo.

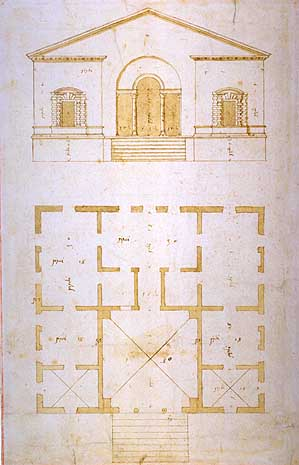
Autograph drawing by Palladio (London, RIBA XVII/2r).

Villa Valmarana (also known as Valmarana Bressan) is a patrician villa at Vigardolo, Monticello Conte Otto, in the province of Vicenza, in northern Italy. The building is attributed to Andrea Palladio on the basis of an extant drawing of the villa that is undoubtedly by the architect.

The villa was constructed during the 1540s, and is one of Palladio's earlier works. It was commissioned by two cousins of the Valmarana family. The layout of the rooms suggests that Palladio's mandate was to provide accommodation for two nuclear families. The design also shows the influence of buildings from antiquity, which Palladio had seen on his first visit to Rome in 1541. The villa is decorated with frescoes, some of which date from the 16th century; they are more or less contemporaneous with the original occupation of the building.

In 1996, UNESCO included the building in the World Heritage Site named "City of Vicenza and the Palladian Villas of the Veneto".

== See also ==
- Palladian Villas of the Veneto
- Palladian architecture
