= Monticello Conte Otto =

- Comune
- Comune di Monticello Conte Otto
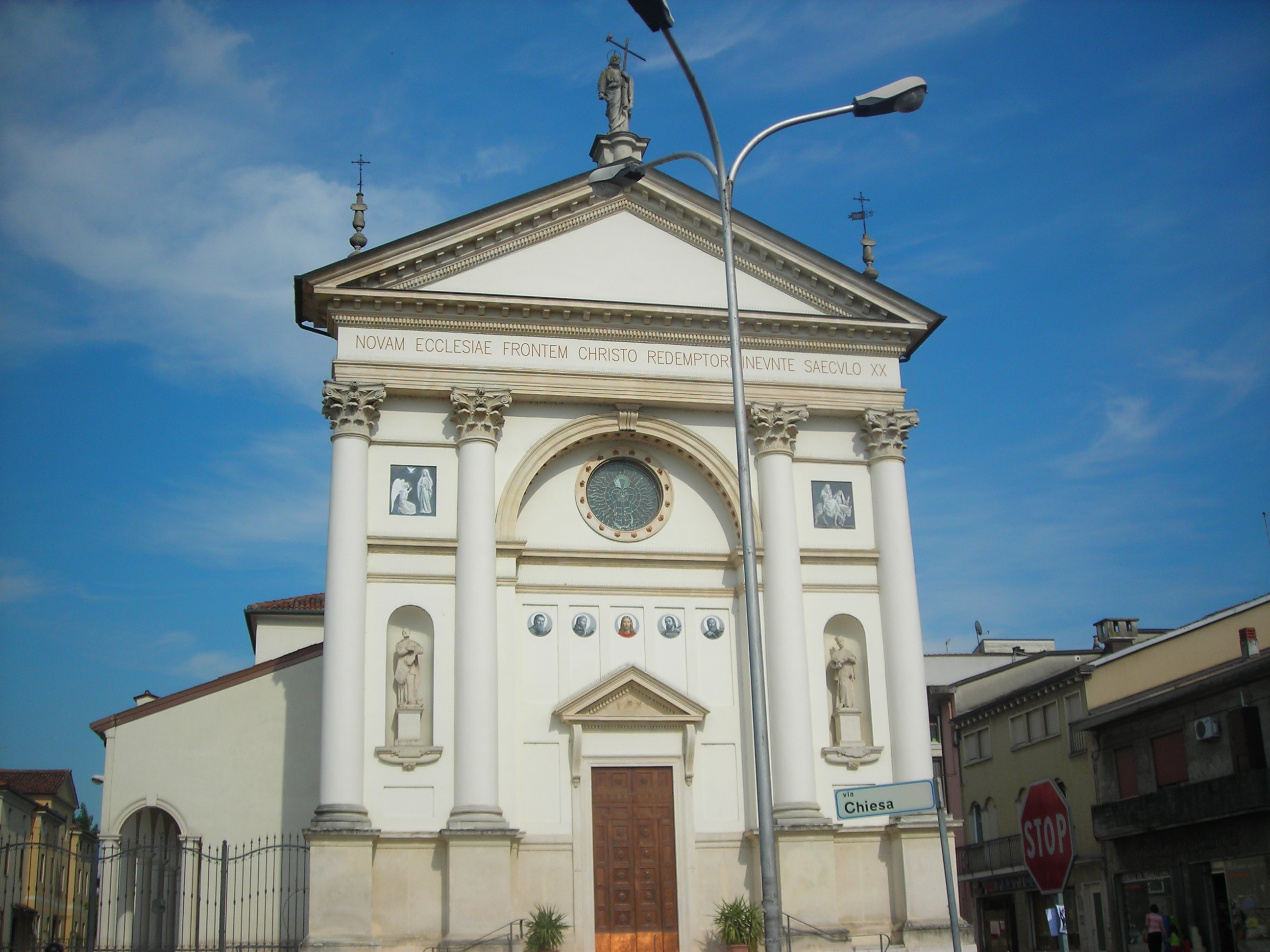
- Church of San Matteo, Monticello Conte Otto

- Coat of arms

- Location within Italy Location within Veneto
- Coordinates: 45°36′N 11°35′E
- Country: Italy
- Region: Veneto
- Province: Vicenza (VI)
- Frazioni: Cavazzale, Vigardolo

Government
  - Mayor: Claudio Benincà

Area
  - Total: 10 km^{2} (3.9 sq mi)
- Elevation: 42 m (138 ft)

Population (31 December 2015)
  - Total: 9,098
  - Density: 910/km^{2} (2,400/sq mi)
- Demonym: Monticellesi
- Time zone: UTC+1 (CET)
  - Summer (DST): UTC+2 (CEST)
- Postal code: 36010
- Dialing code: 0444
- Website: Official website

Monticello Conte Otto is a town and comune in the province of Vicenza, Veneto, Italy. It is east of the SP248 provincial road.

The main attraction is the Villa Valmarana Bressan, attributed to Andrea Palladio.

== Sources ==
- (Google Maps)
