= Villa Valmarana (Lisiera) =

Coordinates: 45°34′47.38″N 11°36′36.93″E

UNESCO World Heritage Site
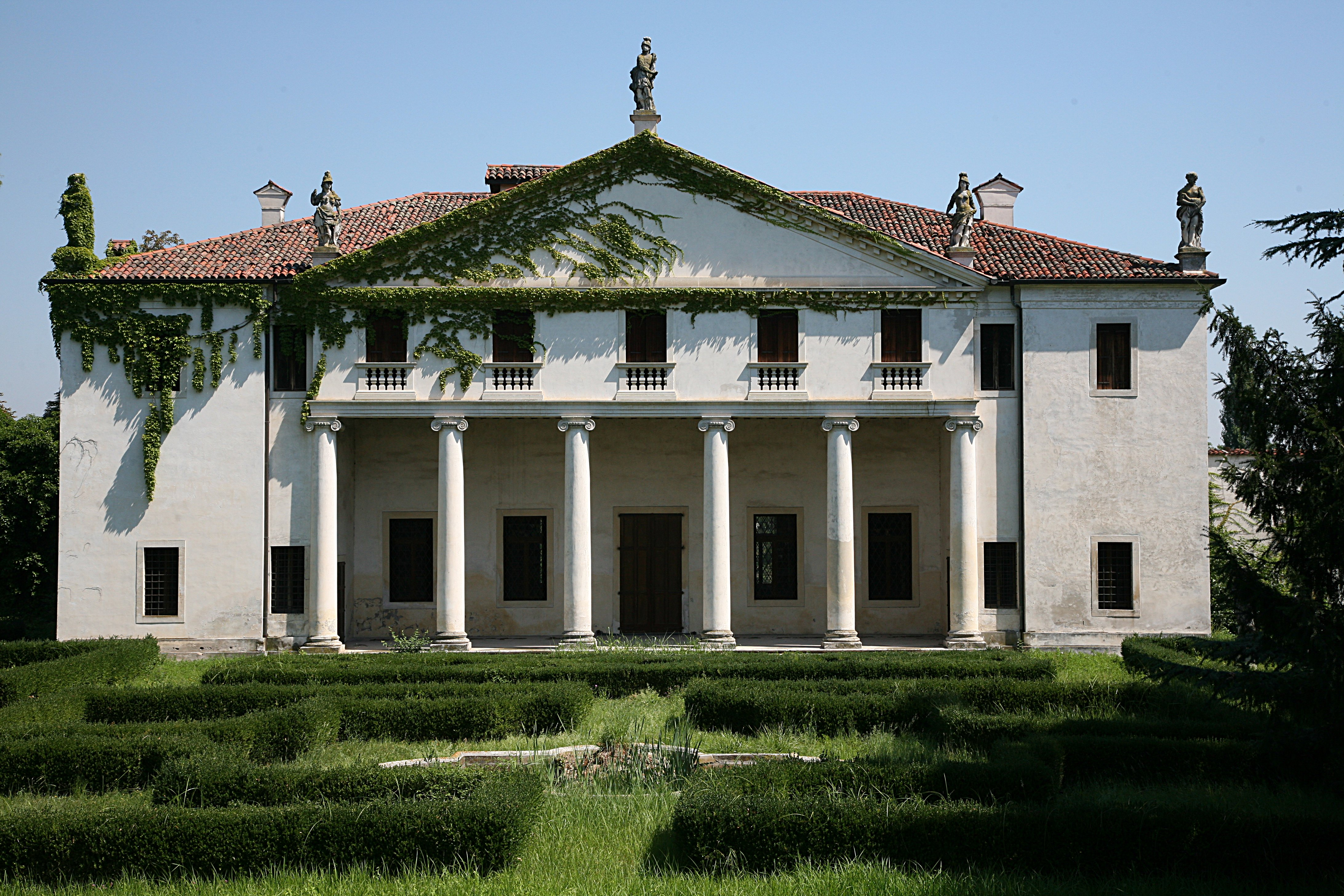
- Villa Valmarana

- Location within Veneto Location within Italy
- Location: Bolzano Vicentino, Province of Vicenza, Veneto, Italy
- Part of: City of Vicenza and the Palladian Villas of the Veneto
- Criteria: Cultural: (i), (ii)
- Reference: 712bis-015
- Inscription: 1994 (18th Session)
- Extensions: 1996

The Villa Valmarana (also known as Valmarana Scagnolari Zen) is a Renaissance villa situated in Lisiera, a locality of Bolzano Vicentino, province of Vicenza, northern Italy. Designed by Andrea Palladio, it was originally built in the 1560s for the Valmarana family.

The villa was nearly totally destroyed during World War II, but has been rebuilt. Even before the war damage, the building did not closely resemble the plan which Palladio published in his I quattro libri dell'architettura (The Four Books of Architecture) of 1570, possibly because Gianfrancesco Valmarana, the architect's client, died while his house was being built.

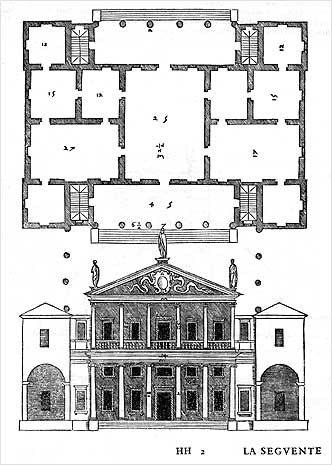
Published version of the project in I quattro libri dell'architettura

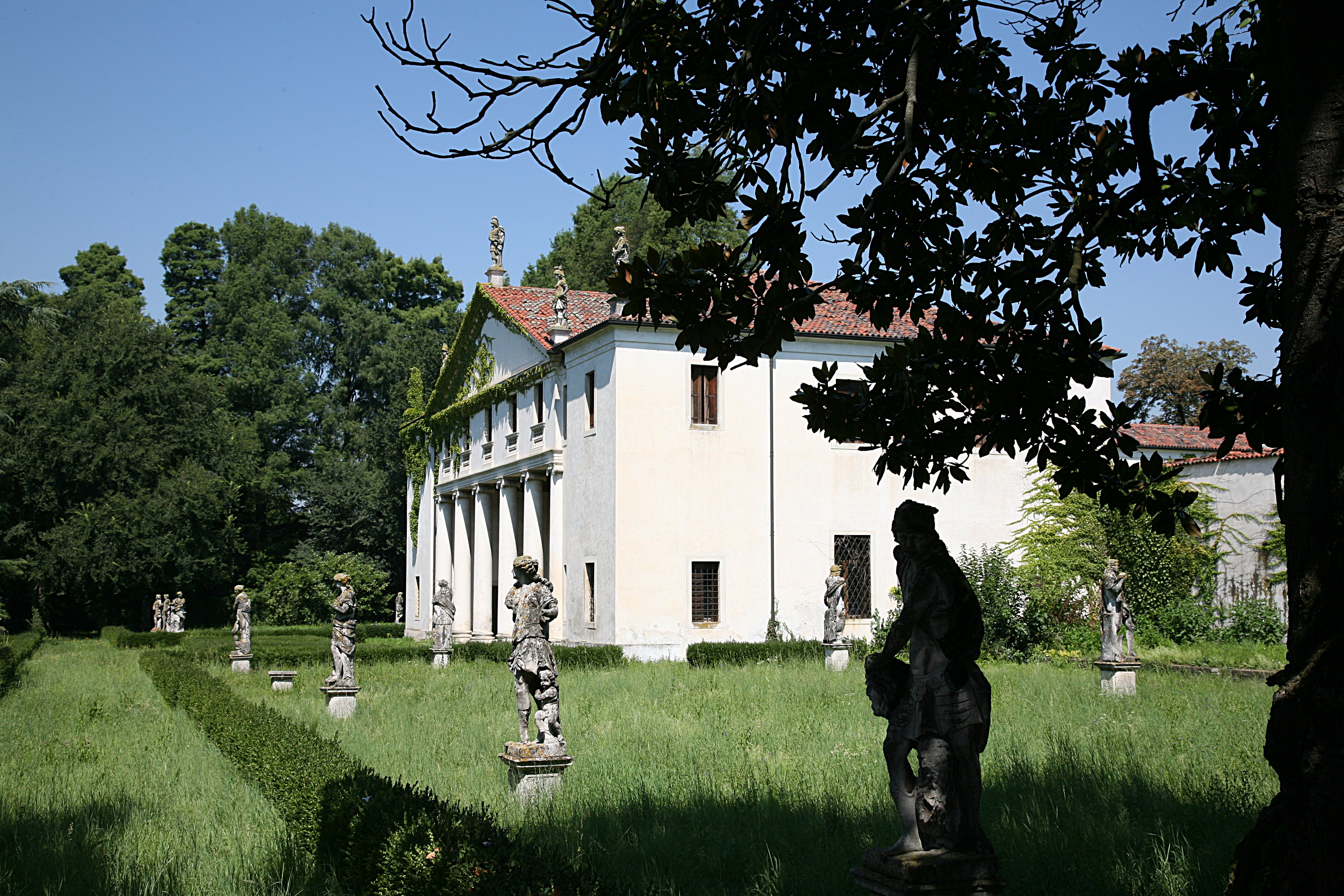
Side view

== See also ==
- Palazzo Valmarana
- Loggia Valmarana
- Palladian Villas of the Veneto
- Palladian architecture
