= Bolzano Vicentino =

- Comune
- Comune di Bolzano Vicentino
- Location within Italy Location within Veneto
- Coordinates: 45°36′N 11°37′E
- Country: Italy
- Region: Veneto
- Province: Vicenza
- Frazioni: Lisiera, Ospedaletto

Area
  - Total: 19.96 km^{2} (7.71 sq mi)
- Elevation: 44 m (144 ft)

Population (28 February 2007)
  - Total: 6,224
  - Density: 311.8/km^{2} (807.6/sq mi)
- Demonym: Bolzanesi
- Time zone: UTC+1 (CET)
  - Summer (DST): UTC+2 (CEST)
- Postal code: 36050
- Dialing code: 0444
- Website: Official website

Bolzano Vicentino is a city and comune in the province of Vicenza, in the northern Italian region of Veneto. It lies east of the A31 highway, with a population of 5,455.

The main attraction is Palladio's Villa Valmarana Scagnolari Zen, situated in the frazione Lisiera.

== Sports ==
=== Football ===
The local football club is A.C. Berton Bolzano Vicentino, whose first team competes in the Promozione.

=== Basketball ===
The town's basketball club is A.S.D. Pallacanestro Bolzano Vicentino. Its first team competes in the men's UISP Padua Amateur Championship.

=== Athletics ===
The local athletics club is A.S.D. Atletica Ardens.

== Sources ==
- (Google Maps)
