= Altavilla Vicentina =

- Comune
- Comune di Altavilla Vicentina
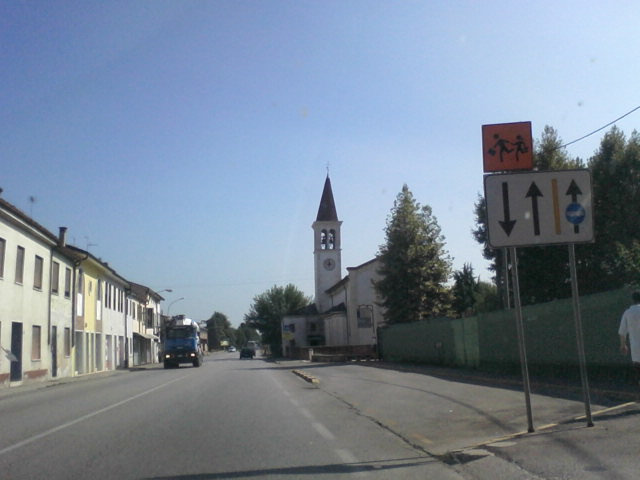
- View of Altavilla Vicentina

- Coat of arms

- Location of Altavilla Vicentina in Italy Altavilla Vicentina (Veneto)
- Coordinates: 45°31′N 11°27′E
- Country: Italy
- Region: Veneto
- Province: Vicenza (VI)
- Frazioni: Sant'Agostino, Tavernelle, Valmarana

Government
  - Mayor: Claudio Catagini

Area
  - Total: 16.72 km^{2} (6.46 sq mi)
- Elevation: 45 m (148 ft)

Population (30 April 2017)
  - Total: 12,012
  - Density: 718.4/km^{2} (1,861/sq mi)
- Demonym: Altavillesi
- Time zone: UTC+1 (CET)
  - Summer (DST): UTC+2 (CEST)
- Postal code: 36077
- Dialing code: 0444
- Patron saint: Holy Reedimer
- Website: Official website

Altavilla Vicentina is a town and comune in the province of Vicenza, Veneto, northern Italy. It is located southwest of Vicenza.

The town originates from a castle (Rocca) built in the Middle Ages over a hill at the feet of the Colli Berici, and now in ruins.

In the communal territory is the Villa Morosini, a picturesque Venetian villa. It was built in 1724 by architect Moroni for count Benedetto Valmarana.
