= Villa Valmarana ai Nani =

Villa in Vicenza, Veneto, Italy

Coordinates: 45°32′06″N 11°33′24″E

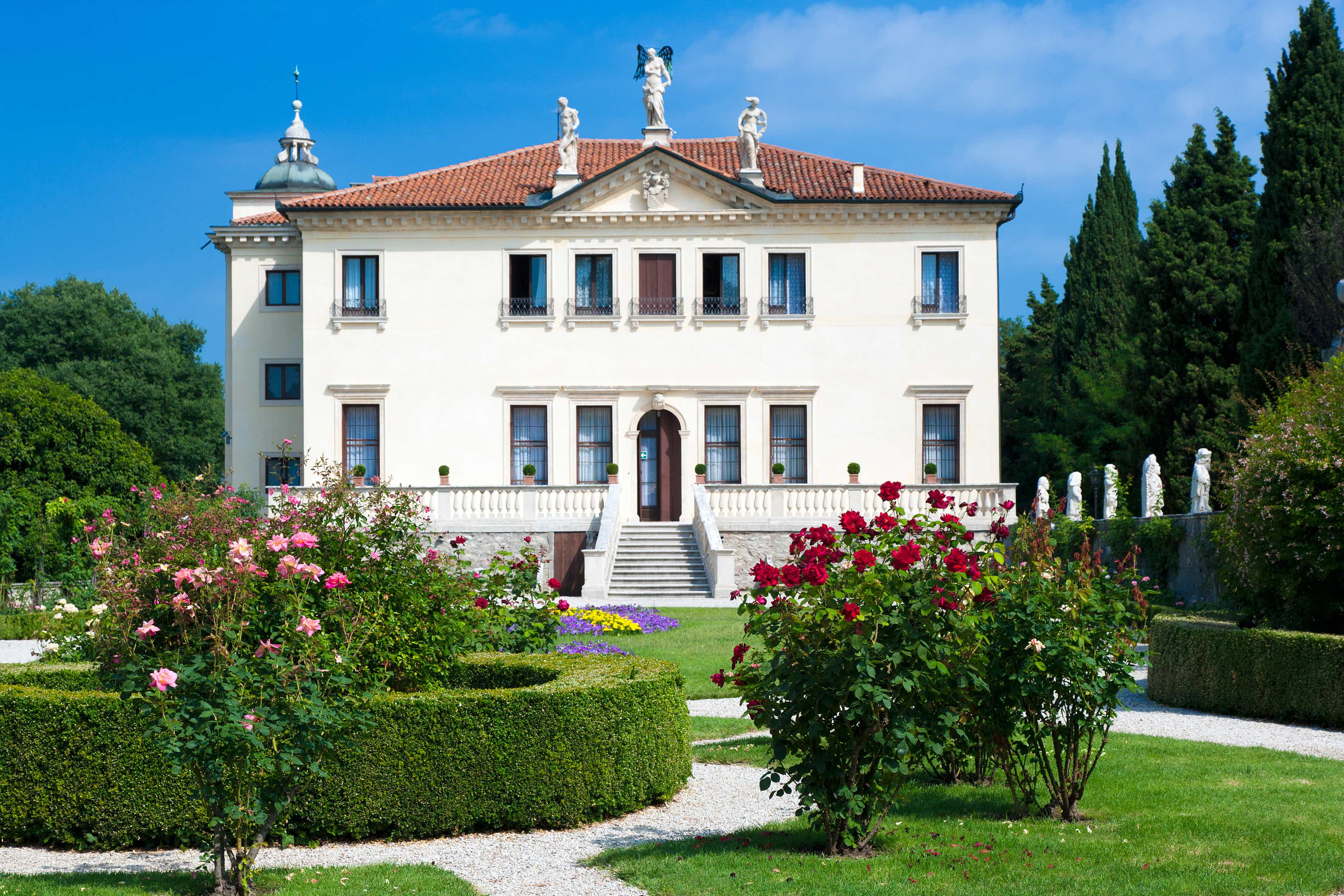
Façade of Villa Valmarana ai Nani

Villa Valmarana ai Nani is a villa at the foot of the gates of the city of Vicenza, Veneto, Italy. The main building was completed in 1670. It is noted for its frescos by Giambattista and Giovanni Domenico Tiepolo and stone sculptures of dwarves (in Italian, "nani").

The villa is named Villa Valmarana ai Nani therein to differentiate it from other villas named Valmarana, especially the very famous Villa Capra "La Rotonda" designed by Andrea Palladio and formerly owned by Mario di Valmarana, a member of another branch of the same family. Villa Valmarana ai Nani was purchased by a set of brothers from the aristocratic Valmarana family in 1720 and is still owned by their descendants.
