= Battista da Vicenza =

Italian painter

- Born: 1375
- Died: 1438 (aged 62–63)
- Occupation: Painter

Battista da Vicenza (circa 1375 – 1438) was an Italian painter of the early Renaissance period; he was the son of painter Luca da Vincenza.

He was born and active in Vicenza. He painted in this town between 1404 and 1438. Among his works are four panels depicting the Life of Saint Sylvester, now housed in the Museo Civico of the Palazzo Chiericati in Vicenza. The scenes are painted against gilded backgrounds.

== Works ==
His works include;

- Annunciation fresco at the church of S. Francesco di Bassano (with his father Luca)
- Polyptych for S. Agostino di Vicenza (1404)
- Polyptych for S. Giorgio di Velo d'Astico (Madonna with saints and donors) (1408)
- Panel A 336 in the Vicenza Museum (with the Madonna and Child Enthroned) (1412)
- several frescoes throughout Vincenza

== Family ==
He was married to Biagia Faldi and they had two daughters, Elisabetta and Maddalena.
