= Grumolo delle Abbadesse =

- Comune
- Comune di Grumolo delle Abbadesse
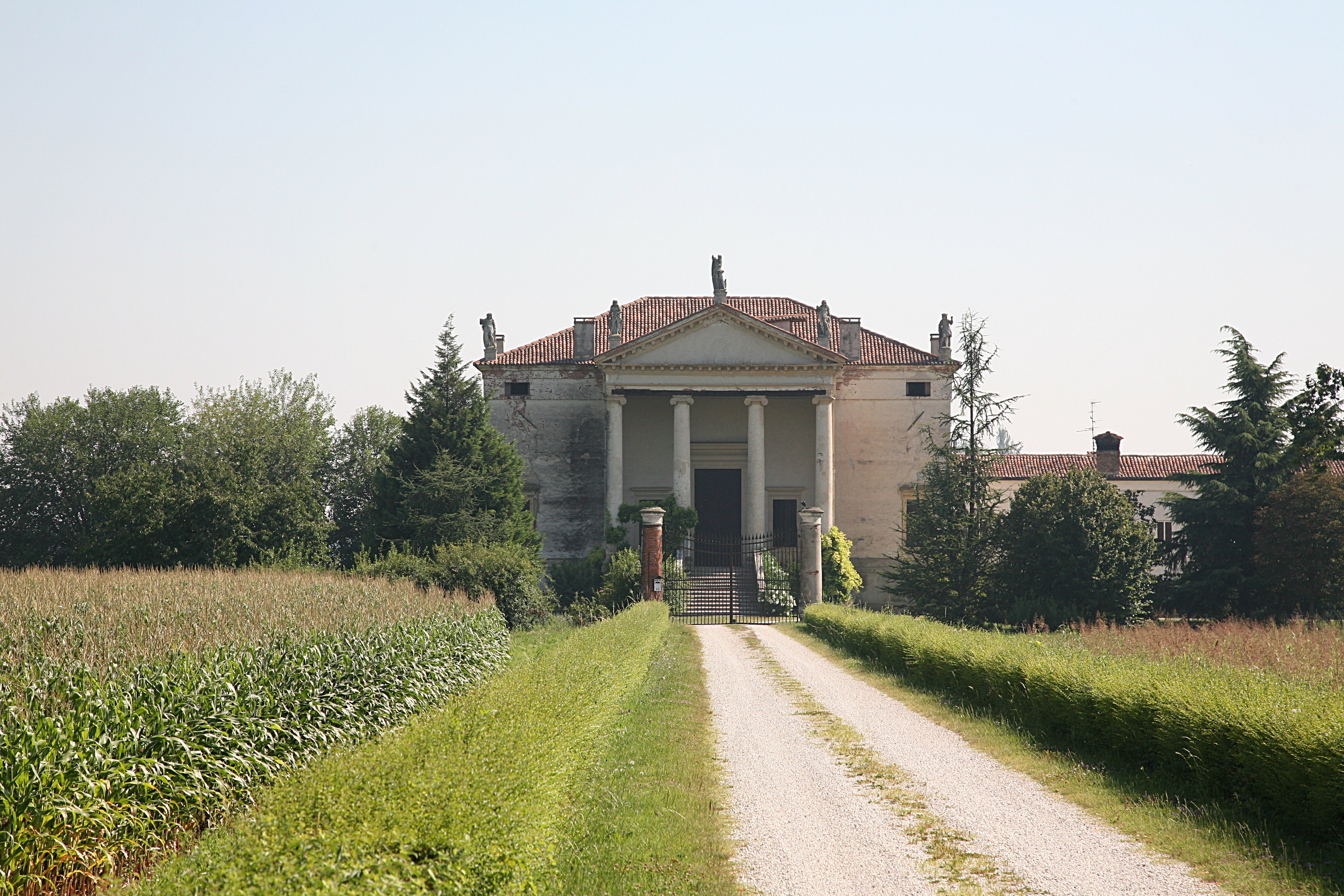
- Villa Chiericati.

- Location within Italy Location within Veneto
- Coordinates: 45°31′N 11°40′E
- Country: Italy
- Region: Veneto
- Province: Vicenza (VI)
- Frazioni: Sarmego, Vancimuglio

Area
  - Total: 14 km^{2} (5.4 sq mi)
- Elevation: 30 m (98 ft)

Population (31 August 2017)
  - Total: 3,746
  - Density: 270/km^{2} (690/sq mi)
- Demonym: Grumolesi
- Time zone: UTC+1 (CET)
  - Summer (DST): UTC+2 (CEST)
- Postal code: 36040
- Dialing code: 0444
- Website: Official website

Grumolo delle Abbadesse is a town and comune in the province of Vicenza, Veneto, north-eastern Italy. It is on SP24 provincial road.

The frazione (hamlet) of Vancimuglio is home to Andrea Palladio's Villa Chiericati.
