= Carlo Borella =

Italian architect

Carlo Borella was an Italian architect of the 17th century. He designed churches in Vicenza and is thought to have been the architect responsible for the completion of Palladio's Palazzo Chiericati.

One of Borella's notable works is the church at Monte Berico, Vicenza. Completed between 1688 and 1703, this work foregoes the Palladian influences of most Vicentine architecture in favor of the more modern and ornate Baroque.
