= Monte Berico =

Roman Catholic and minor basilica in Vicenza, northern Italy

Basilica of St. Mary of Mount Berico
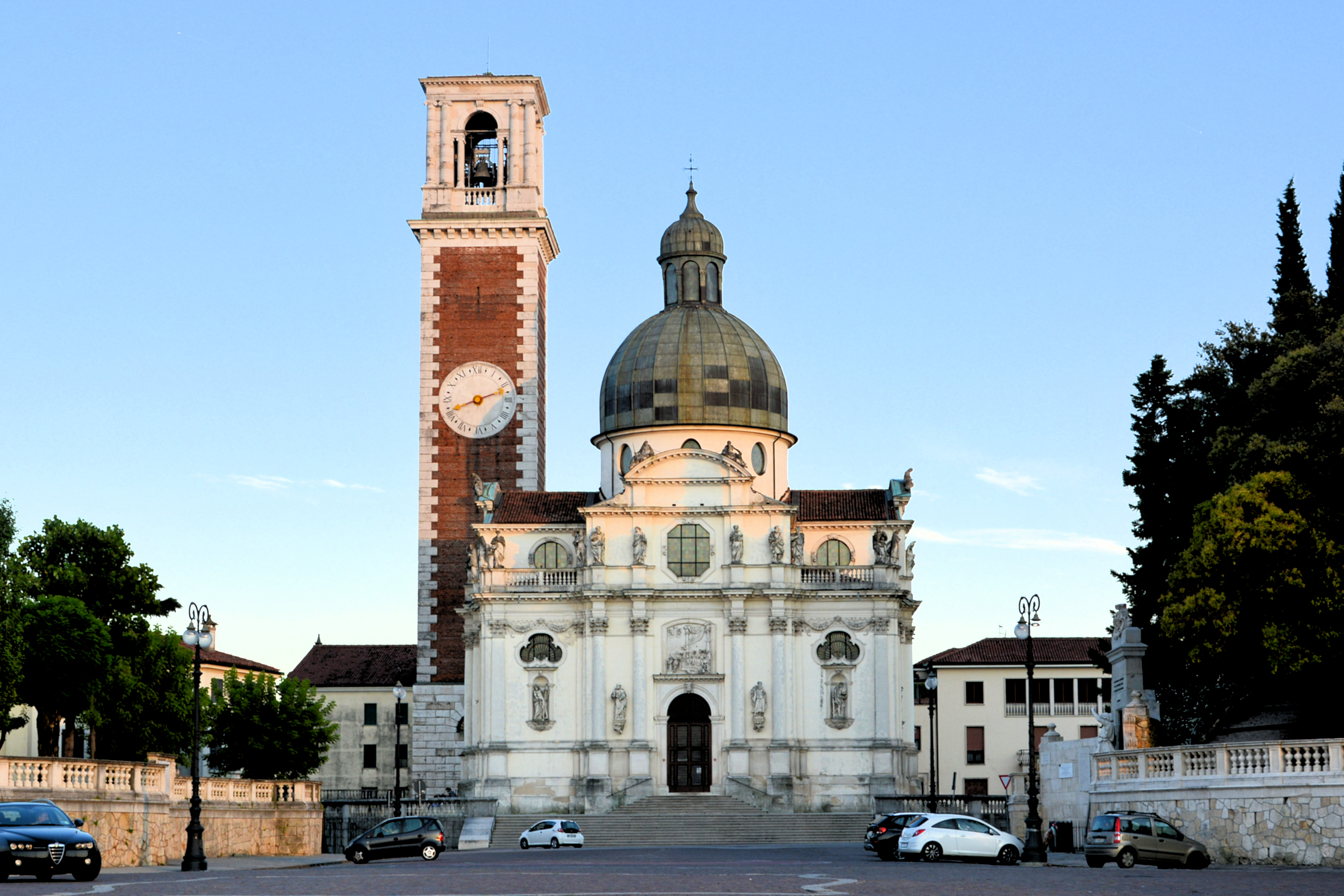
- Piazzale della Vittoria

Religion
- Affiliation: Roman Catholic
- Ecclesiastical or organisational status: Minor basilica (1904)
- Year consecrated: 1435

Location
- Location: Vicenza, Italy
- Interactive map of Basilica of St. Mary of Mount Berico
- Coordinates: 45°32′5.78″N 11°32′43.63″E

Architecture
- Architects: Andrea Palladio; Nicolò da Venezia; Carlo Borrello; Giacomo Bragadin
- Type: Church
- Style: Baroque
- Groundbreaking: 1430, 1688
- Completed: 1703

Specifications
- Capacity: 1,500 +
- Length: 42 m (138 ft)
- Width: 27 m (89 ft)
- Width (nave): 13 m
- Materials: Stone and marble

Website
- www.monteberico.it

The Church of St. Mary of Mount Berico (Italian: Basilica di S. Maria di Monte Berico) is a Roman Catholic and minor basilica in Vicenza, northern Italy. The church is a Marian shrine, and stands at the top of a hill which overlooks the city.

== Origins ==
According to the tradition, as recorded in several documents, the Blessed Virgin appeared on the hill twice to a peasant worker named Vincenza Pasini; the first time occurred on March 7, 1426, the second on August 1, 1428. At this time in Veneto, people and economy had been suffering from a terrible plague for years. Mary promised that if people of Vicenza built a church on the top of the hill she would rid them of the plague. People kept their promise and the church was built in 3 months.

The original church later became a sanctuary. It was designed by the architect Carlo Borella (1688) and was decorated by the sculptor Orazio Marinali from Bassano. The city of Vicenza ordered an inquiry through the Notary Publics to look into these two exceptional events. The inquiry followed through during November, 1430. The court recordings are still preserved today in the city library, 'Biblioteca Civica Bertoliana'.

The first religious services of the basilica were given to the Order of Bridgettines (the Franciscan Order of Santa Brigida) by the city on November 2, 1429. At the end of May, 1435, the nuns of Saint Brigid were ordered to leave the basilica by order of Pope Eugene IV on March 18, 1435, and were ordered to return to their original way of life of their order's foundation.

The Vicenza city magistracy was given the rights to Monte Berico. They then proceeded to cede the church and convent to the Servite Order (Servants of Mary) on May 31, 1435. The next day, Francesco Malipiero, the bishop of Vicenza, gave the chapel the name that still exists today.

In 1821 were cast the 15 bells in B, rung in the Veronese bellringing art.

== Piazzale della Vittoria ==
Piazzale della Vittoria is the square in front of the basilica which was dedicated September 23, 1924. It lies at the front of the northern facade and shows a full view of the city of Vicenza. A vast circular cement railing circles around this large open balcony, which looks out over the city.

On the top of the railings there are markers that point out the well-known cities and panoramic views. One of the best known views is Monte Grappa. Some other sites that can be viewed are the foothills of the Alps (Dolomites), along with the Lessini hills, Venetian Lagoon, Mount Pasubio, Piave River, and many other sites in Veneto.

== The Madonna ==
The statue of the Virgin Mary was sculpted by Nicolò da Venezia in 1430, two years after the second apparition to a local peasant named Vincenza Pasini.

== Restoration ==
The original basilica has been restored repeatedly during the centuries, sometimes with famous architects such as Palladio, Piovene and Miglioranza. All these changes are still visible today.

== Architecture ==
The stairs constructed in honour of the Blessed Virgin Mary in 1595 were ordered by Giacomo Bragadin, a leading figure of the Republic of Venice in Vicenza. The stairway terminates in a small open clearing halfway up the hill where there is a view of the city below.

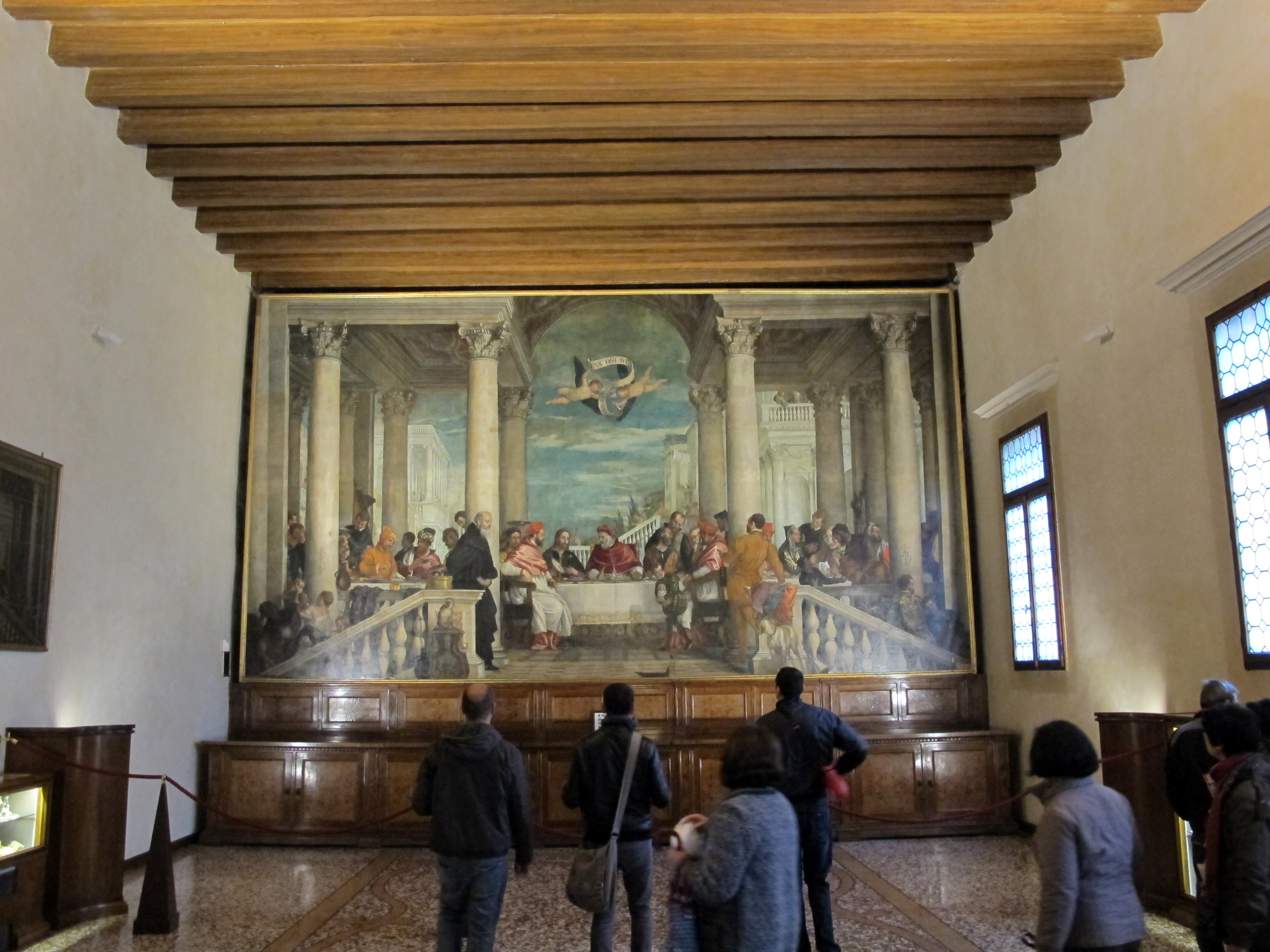
Veronese's The Supper of St. Gregory

This walkway currently connects the city with the Sanctuary of the Madonna. These stairs were designed and built by Francesco Muttoni on March 7, 1746. The total length of the stairs is around 700 meters, consisting of 150 arches, grouped in tens. Each group is divided to symbolize the 15 mysteries and the 150 Hail Marys in the rosary.

The church contains a number of artworks, including:

- The supper of St Gregory by Paolo Veronese (1572).

The supper of St. Gregory recalls an event wherein, Gregory who always dined with 12 individuals to recall the last supper, once found that while dining an unexpected pilgrim arrived . Later this pilgrim identified himself as Jesus. The monkey in chain supposedly symbolizes paganism; while the dog symbolizes the power of fealty.

- Pietà by Bartolomeo Montagna (early 1500s)
- Virgin with four evangelists and the Baptism of Christ, by Alessandro Maganza
- The main altarpiece depicts an "Allegory of the people of Vicenza present the church of Monte Berico to the Virgin" by Giulio Carpioni.
