= Vancimuglio =

Frazione in Grumolo delle Abbadesse, Veneto, Italy

Coordinates: 45.5021°N 11.6416°E

Vancimuglio is a frazione of the comune of Grumolo delle Abbadesse, in the province of Vicenza, Veneto, northern Italy.

It is the location of Andrea Palladio's Villa Chiericati.
