= Chiericati family =

Italian noble family

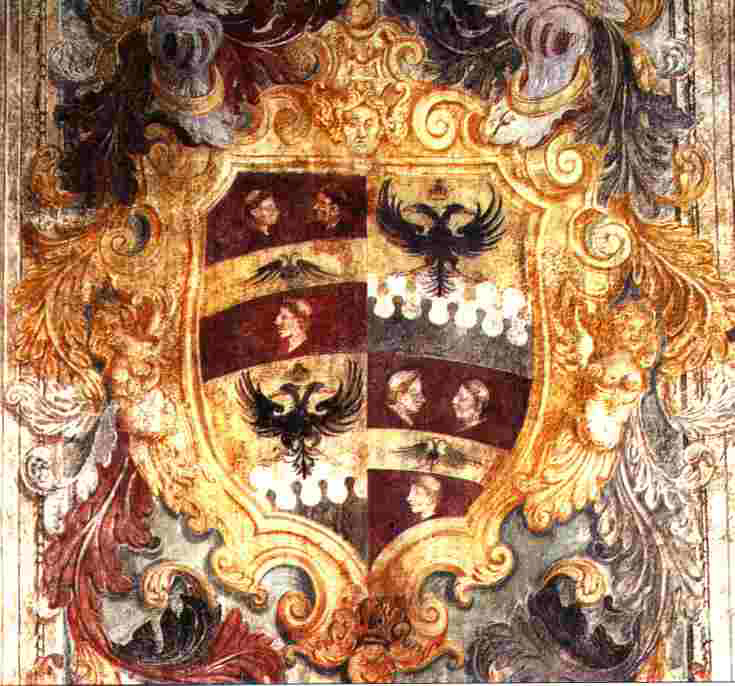
Coat of arms of the Chiericati family

The Chiericati family were an affluent Italian noble family from Vicenza, during the 16th century. The most notable were the three brothers who divided the family holdings and estates. Two of the brothers were to be patrons of Andrea Palladio.

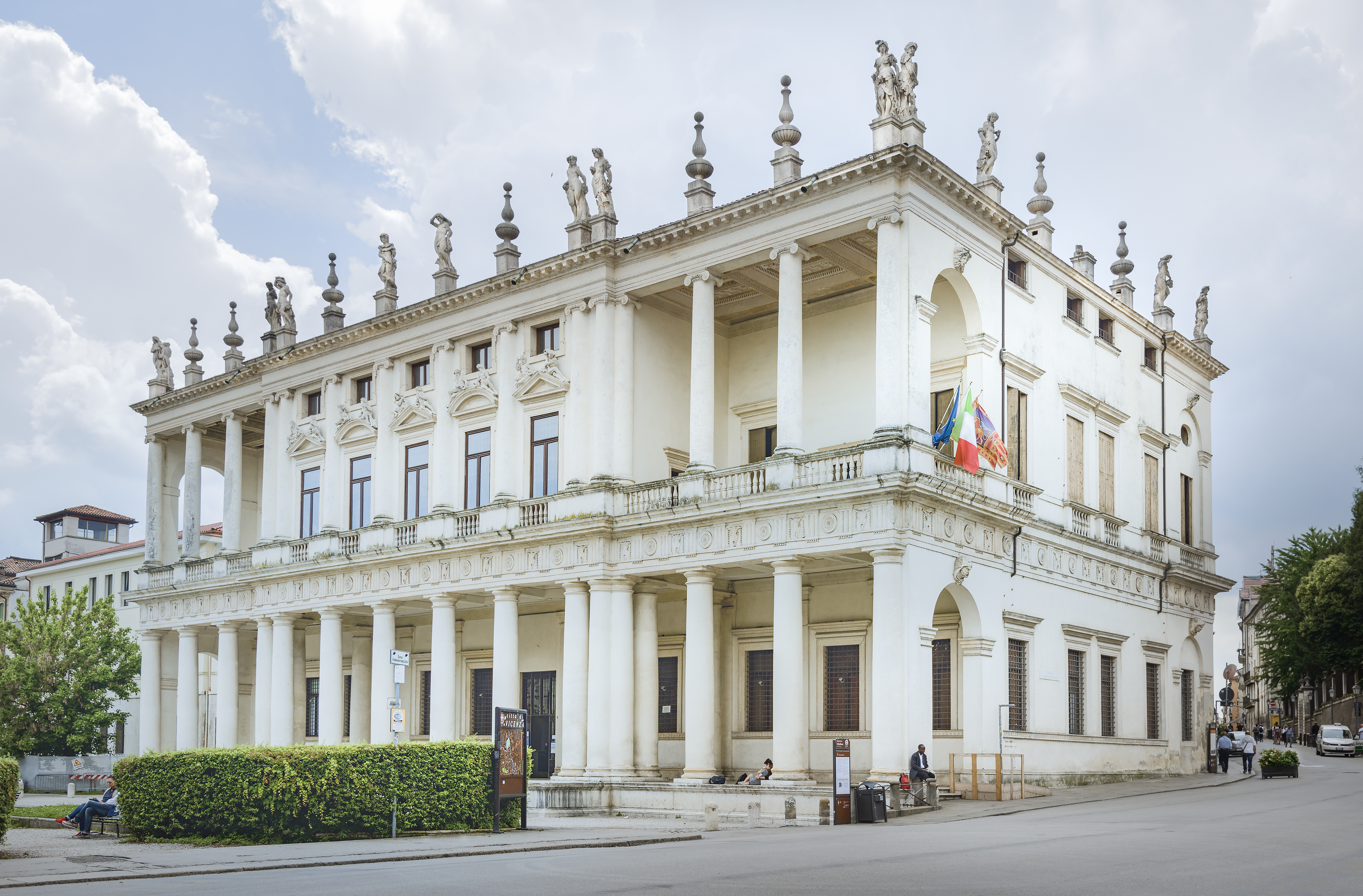
Palazzo Chiericati, Vicenza, designed by Palladio for Girolamo Chiericati

Count Girolamo Chiericati (??? – 1557) was an elected commissioner of Palladio's Basilica. He was among those who favored giving important civic commissions to the inexperienced Palladio, personally championing his cause in municipal debate. He also commissioned the Palazzo Chiericati in 1550 on family land in Vicenza. After his death his son Valerio Chiericati inherited the Palazzo Chiericati.

Giovanni Chiericati commissioned from Palladio the Villa Chiericati in the 1550s but did not live long enough to see it completed.
