= Villa Chiericati =

UNESCO World Heritage Site
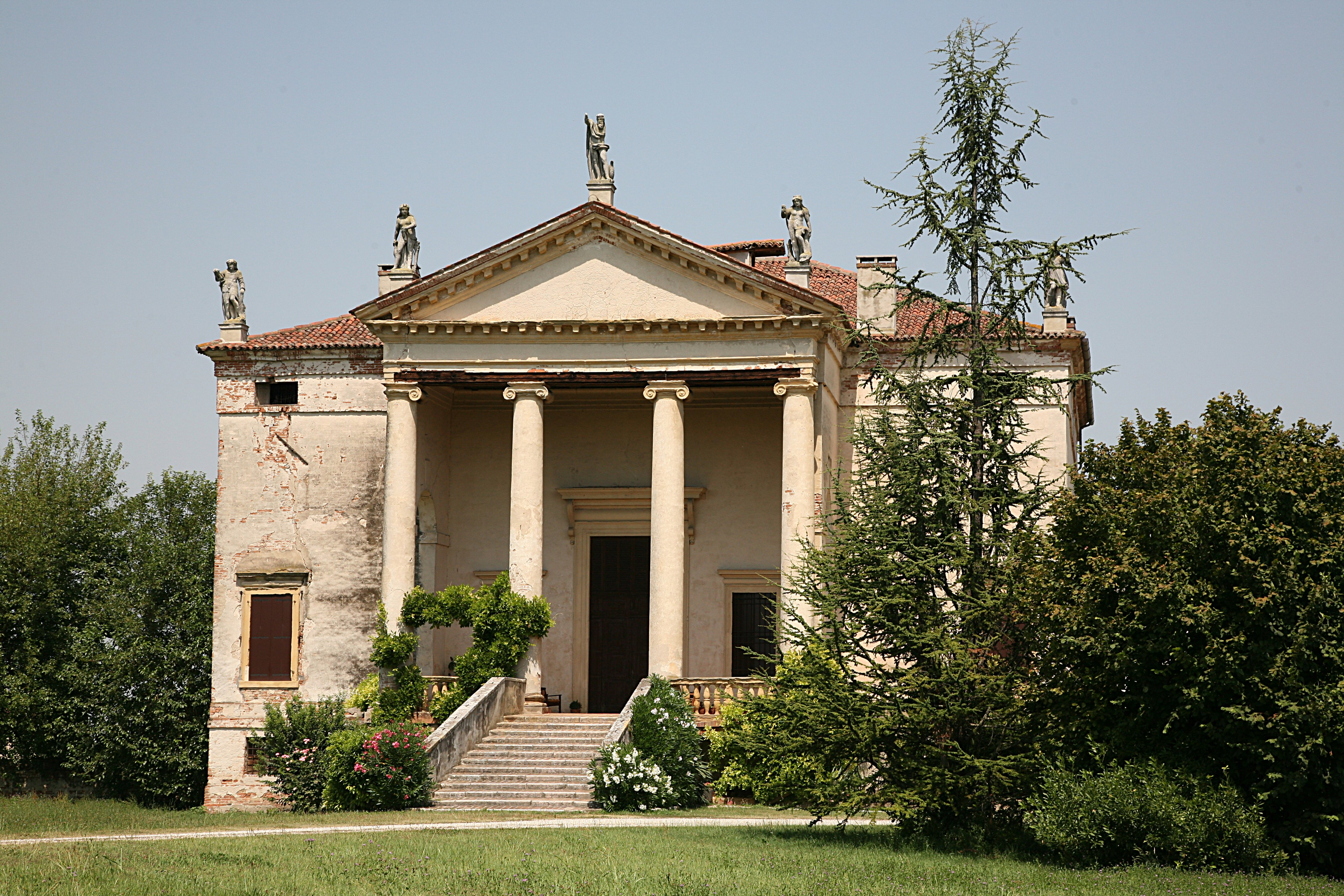

- Location within Veneto Location within Italy
- Location: Vancimuglio, Veneto, Italy
- Part of: City of Vicenza and the Palladian Villas of the Veneto
- Criteria: Cultural: (i)(ii)
- Reference: 712bis-007
- Inscription: 1994 (18th Session)
- Extensions: 1996
- Coordinates: 45°30′12″N 11°38′39″E

Villa Chiericati (also known as Villa Chiericati-Rigo) is a villa at Vancimuglio in the Veneto, northern Italy. It was designed for Giovanni Chiericati by the architect Andrea Palladio in the early 1550s.

Palladio also designed the family's town house Palazzo Chiericati in Vicenza.

In 1996, UNESCO included the villa in the World Heritage Site City of Vicenza and the Palladian Villas of the Veneto.

== Architecture ==
The villa is square. A portico projects from its principal façade. (This was the first time a temple pronaos had been incorporated into a villa's design). The principal rooms are built upon a piano nobile above a semi-basement. The upper floor is very much of secondary importance. The design of the villa was to be the prototype for Palladio's later works at the Villa Rotonda and the Villa Malcontenta.

Work on the villa stopped after the death of Palladio's client. It was not finally completed until after it had been purchased by Ludovico Porto in 1574. In 1584 he employed the architect Domenico Groppino, who had collaborated with Palladio on other projects, to complete the villa.

There is some debate as to the extent Groppino influenced the eventual design of the building. While the portico is undoubtedly by the hand of Palladio himself, the position of the windows is at variance with the architect's own advice in I quattro libri dell'architettura, where he warns against placing windows near the corner of a building lest it weaken the structure (the villa does in fact reveal signs of settlement here).

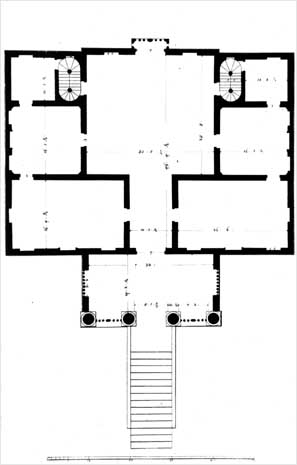
Floor plan (drawing by Ottavio Bertotti Scamozzi, 1781)

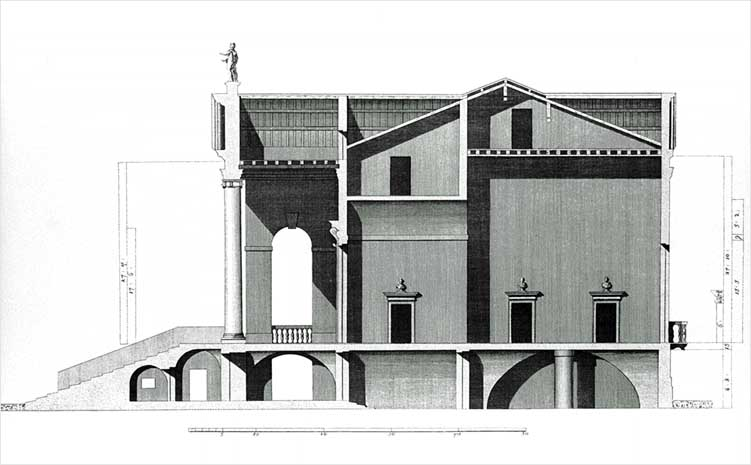
Cross section (drawing by Ottavio Bertotti Scamozzi, 1781)

== See also ==
- Palladian Villas of the Veneto
- Palladian architecture
- Palazzo Chiericati
