= Palazzo Chiericati =

Coordinates: 45°32′57″N 11°32′57″E

UNESCO World Heritage Site
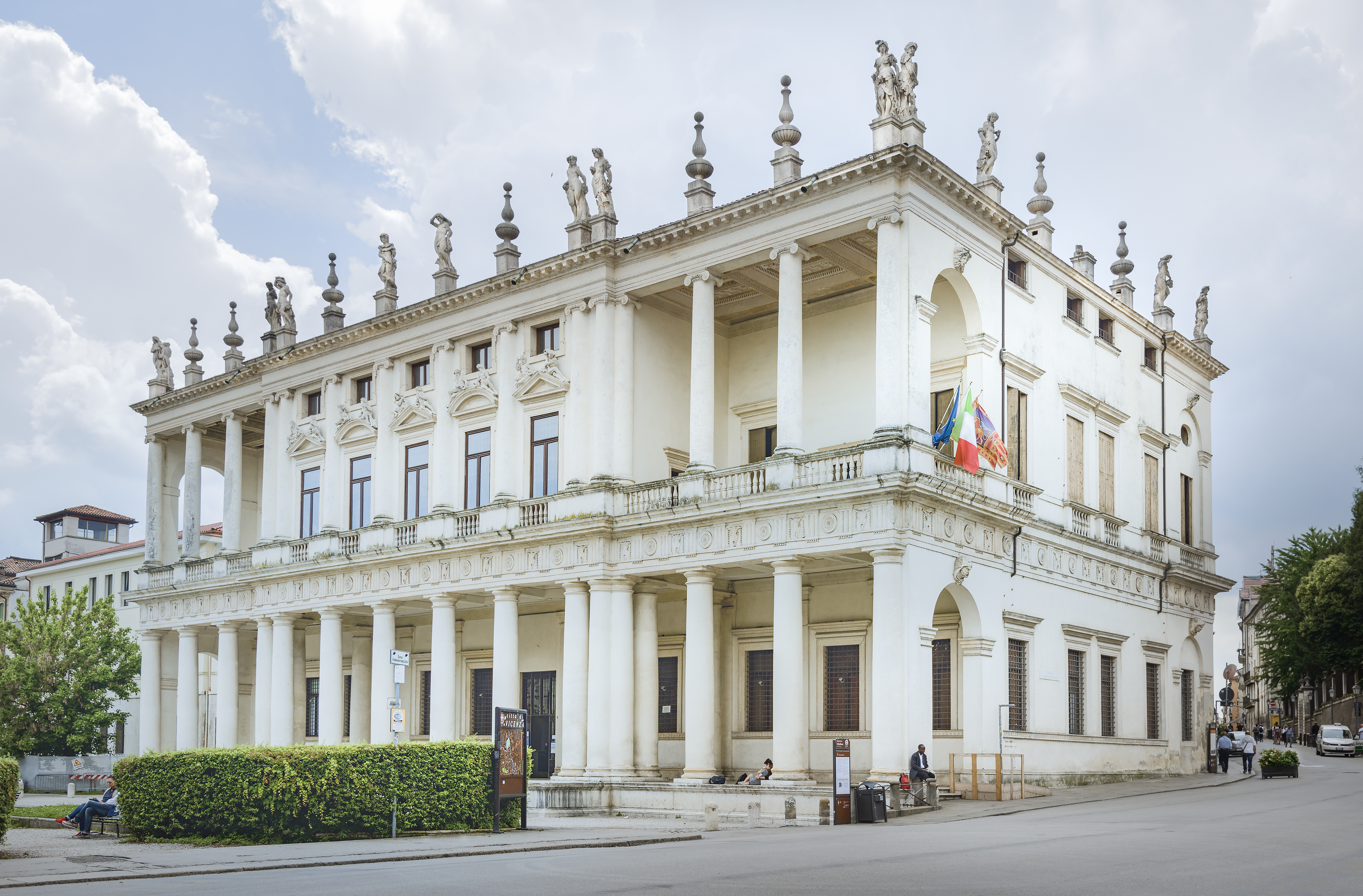

- Location within Veneto Location within Italy
- Location: Vicenza, Veneto, Italy
- Part of: City of Vicenza and the Palladian Villas of the Veneto
- Criteria: Cultural: (i)(ii)
- Reference: 712bis-001
- Inscription: 1994 (18th Session)
- Extensions: 1996
- Website: Official website

The Palazzo Chiericati is a Renaissance palace in Vicenza, Italy, designed by Andrea Palladio.

== History ==
Palladio was asked to design and build the palazzo by Count Girolamo Chiericati. The architect started building the palace in 1550, and some further work was completed under the patronage of Chiericati's son, Valerio. However, the palazzo was not fully finished until about 1680, possibly by Carlo Borella.

Palladio also designed a country home, the Villa Chiericati, for the family.

The palazzo was built in an area called "piazza dell'Isola" (island square, currently Piazza Matteotti), which housed the wood and cattle market. At that time, it was an islet surrounded by the Retrone and Bacchiglione streams, and to protect the structure from the frequent floods, Palladio designed it on an elevated position: the entrance could be accessed by a triple Classic-style staircase.

== Architecture ==
The palazzo's principal façade is composed of three bays, the central bay projecting slightly. The two end bays have logge on the piano nobile level, while the central bay is closed. The façade has two superposed orders of columns, Doric on the lower level with Ionic above. The roof line is decorated by statuary.

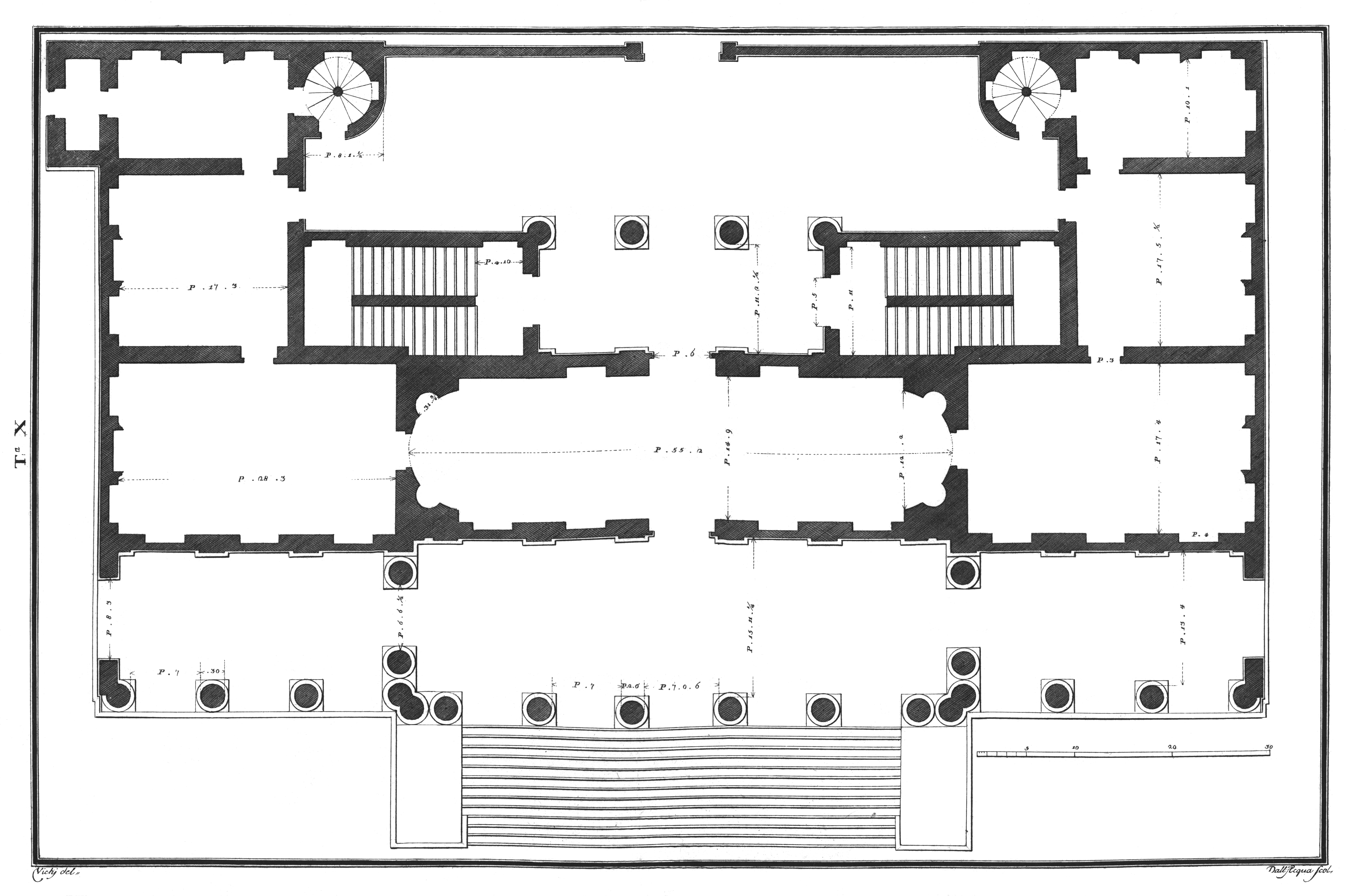
Floor plan (drawing by Ottavio Bertotti Scamozzi, 1776)

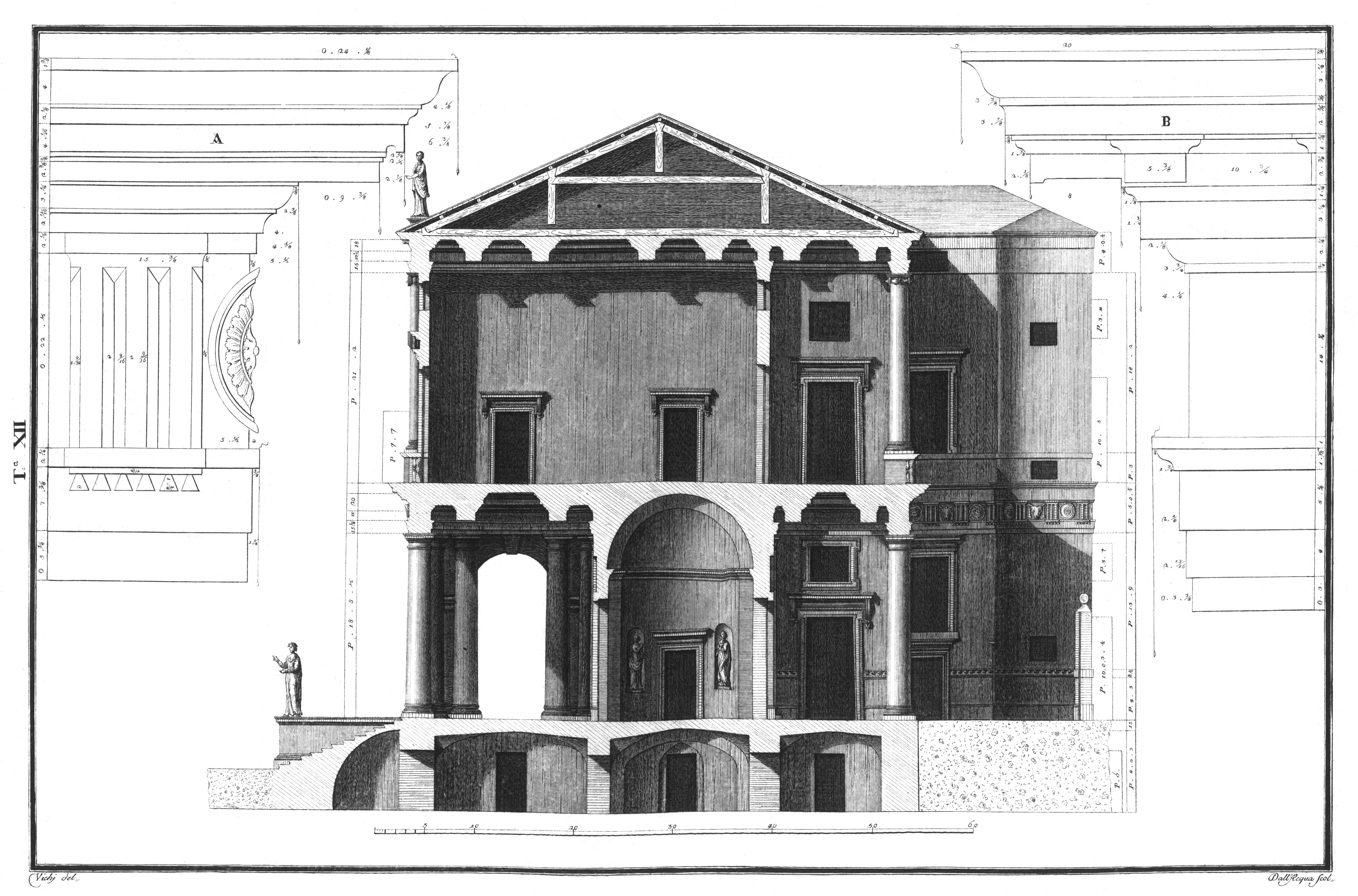
Cross section (Ottavio Bertotti Scamozzi, 1776)

== Conservation ==
Since 1855 the building has housed the Museo Civico ('City Museum') and, more recently, the city's art gallery. It has received international protection since 1994, along with the other Palladian buildings of Vicenza, as part of a World Heritage Site. (The site originally designated was "Vicenza, City of Palladio" which included the city of Vicenza and its immediate surroundings. In 1996, UNESCO expanded the World Heritage Site to include villas outside the core area and renamed it "City of Vicenza and the Palladian Villas of the Veneto").

== Gallery ==
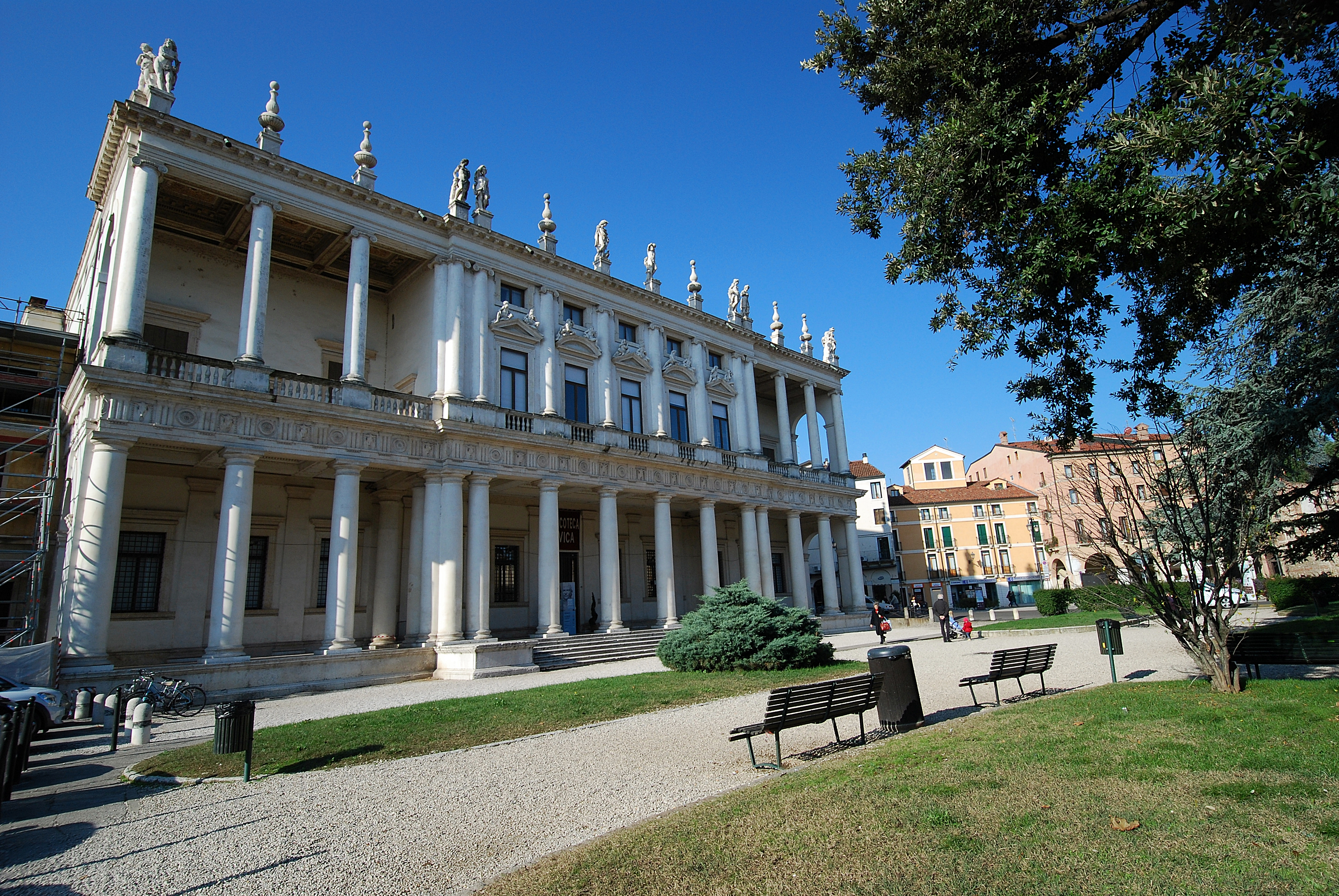
The double loggia.

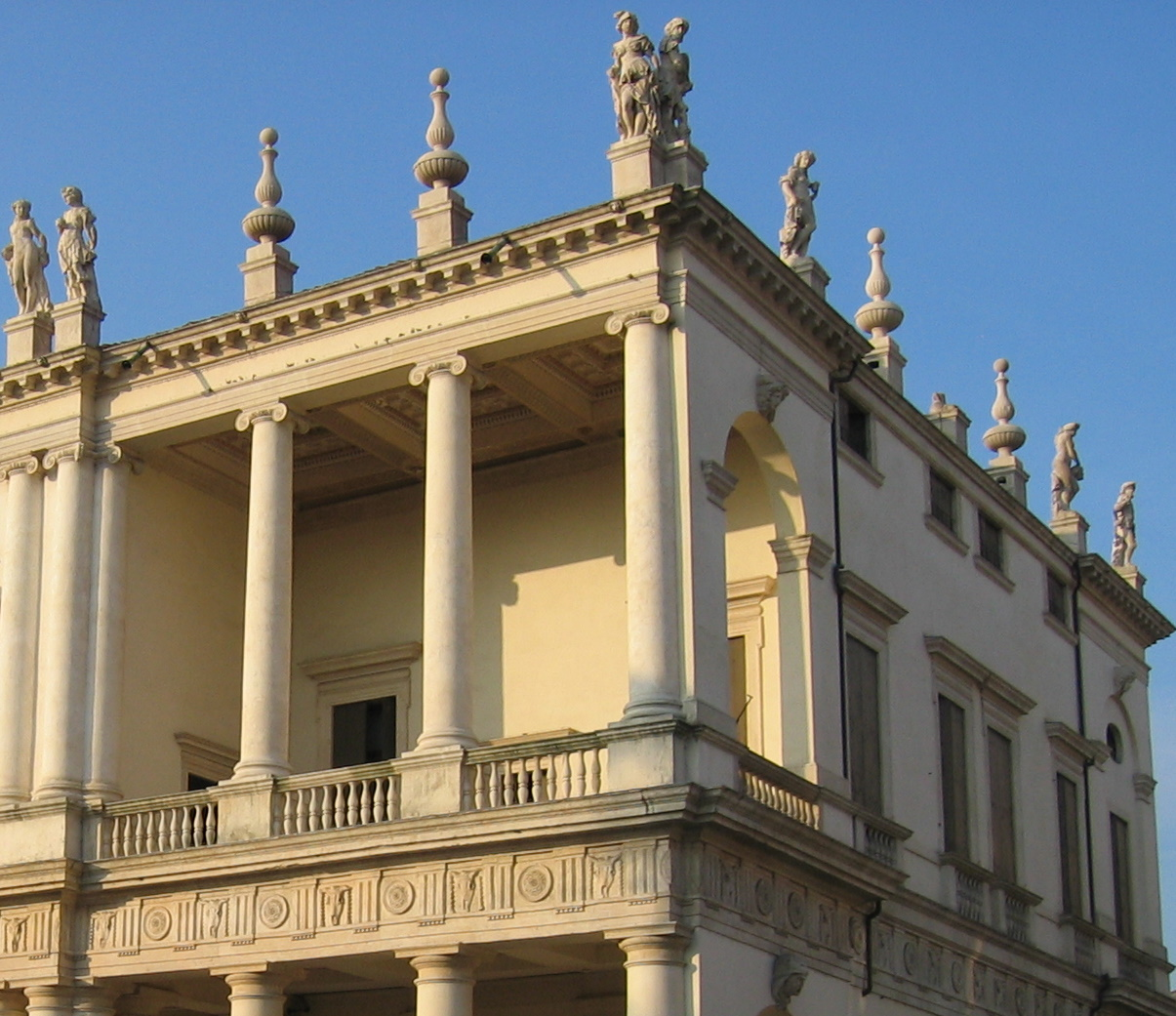
Detail of the roofline

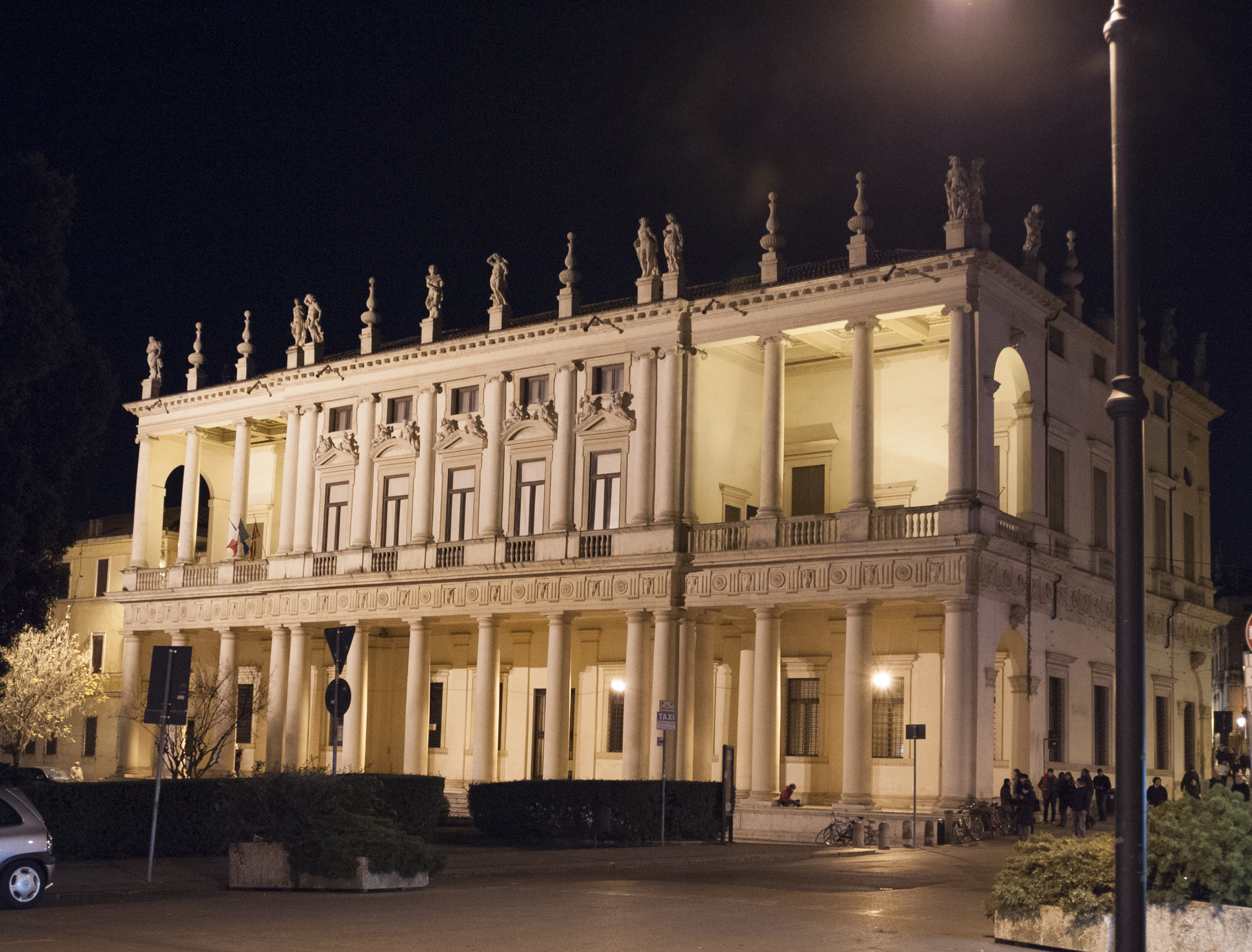
By night

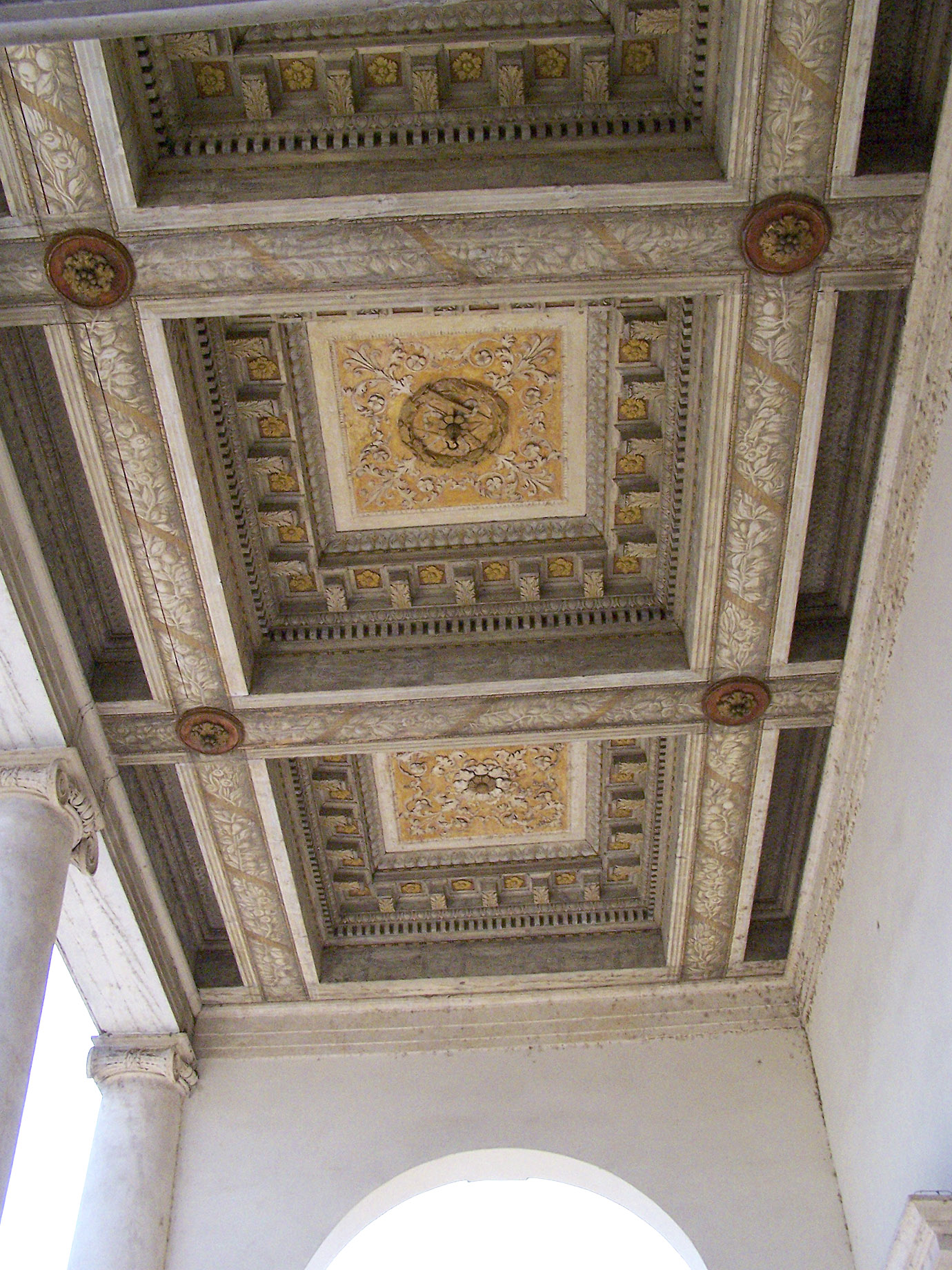
Painted ceiling in the open loggia

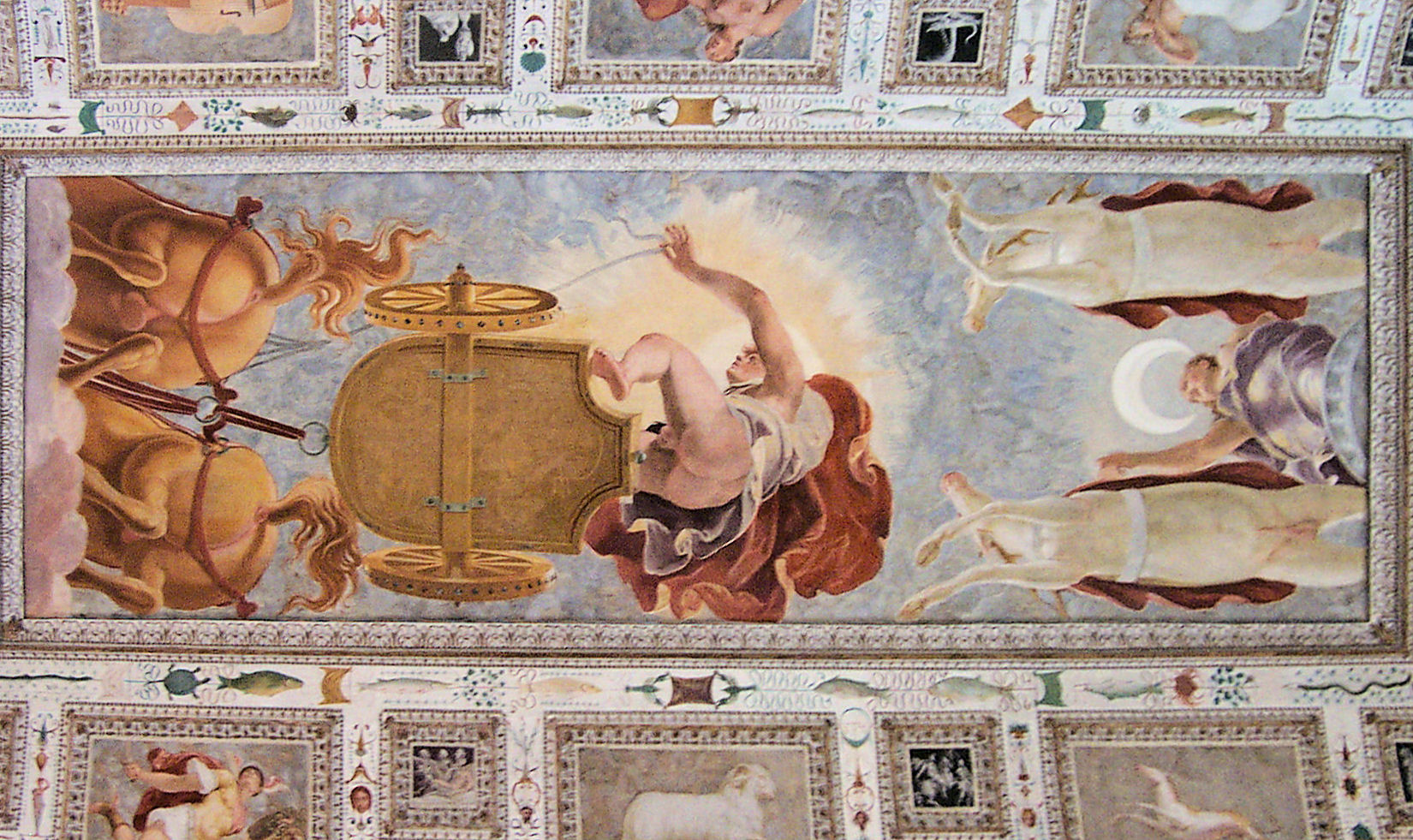
Ceiling panel in the vestibule

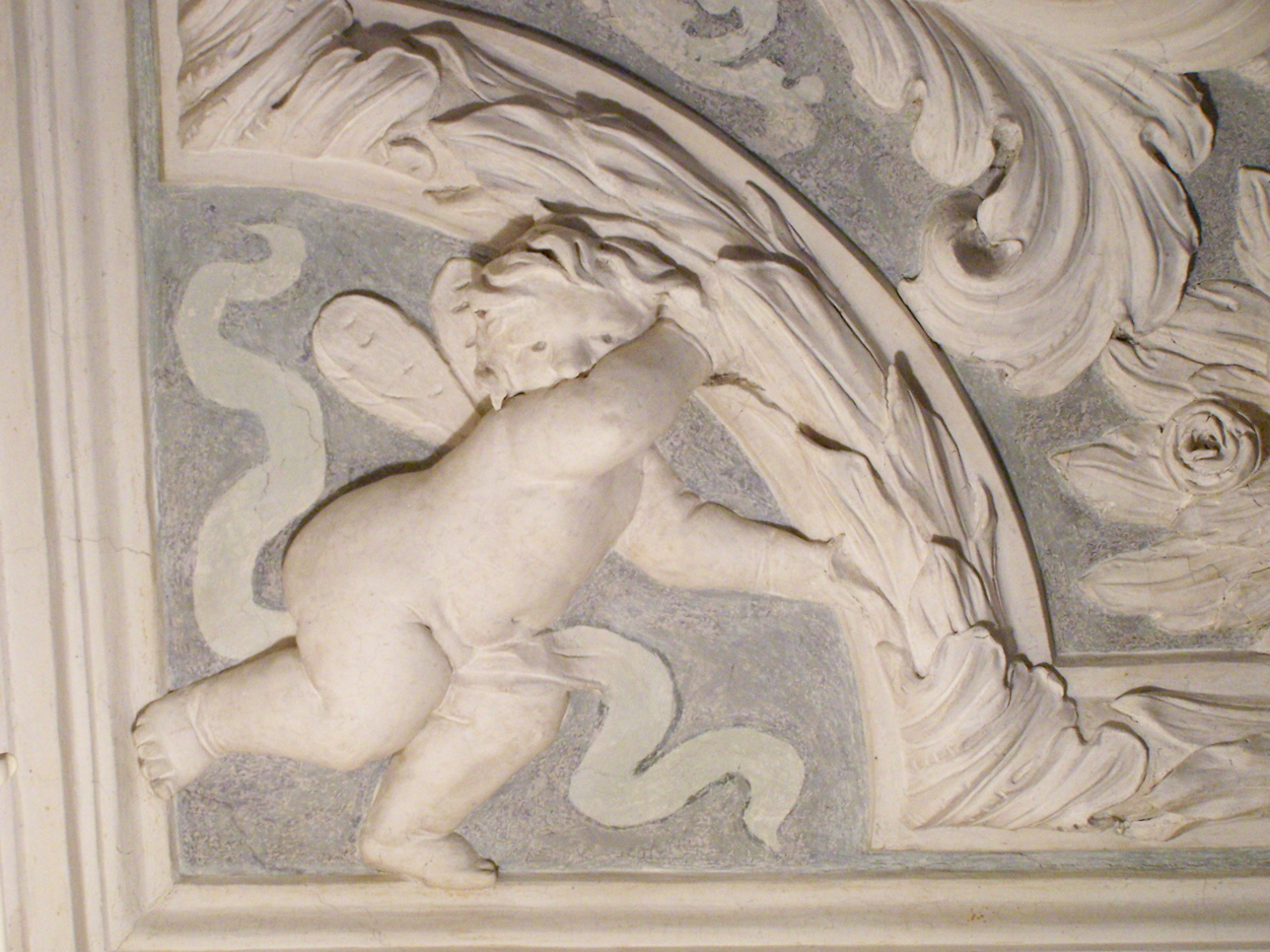

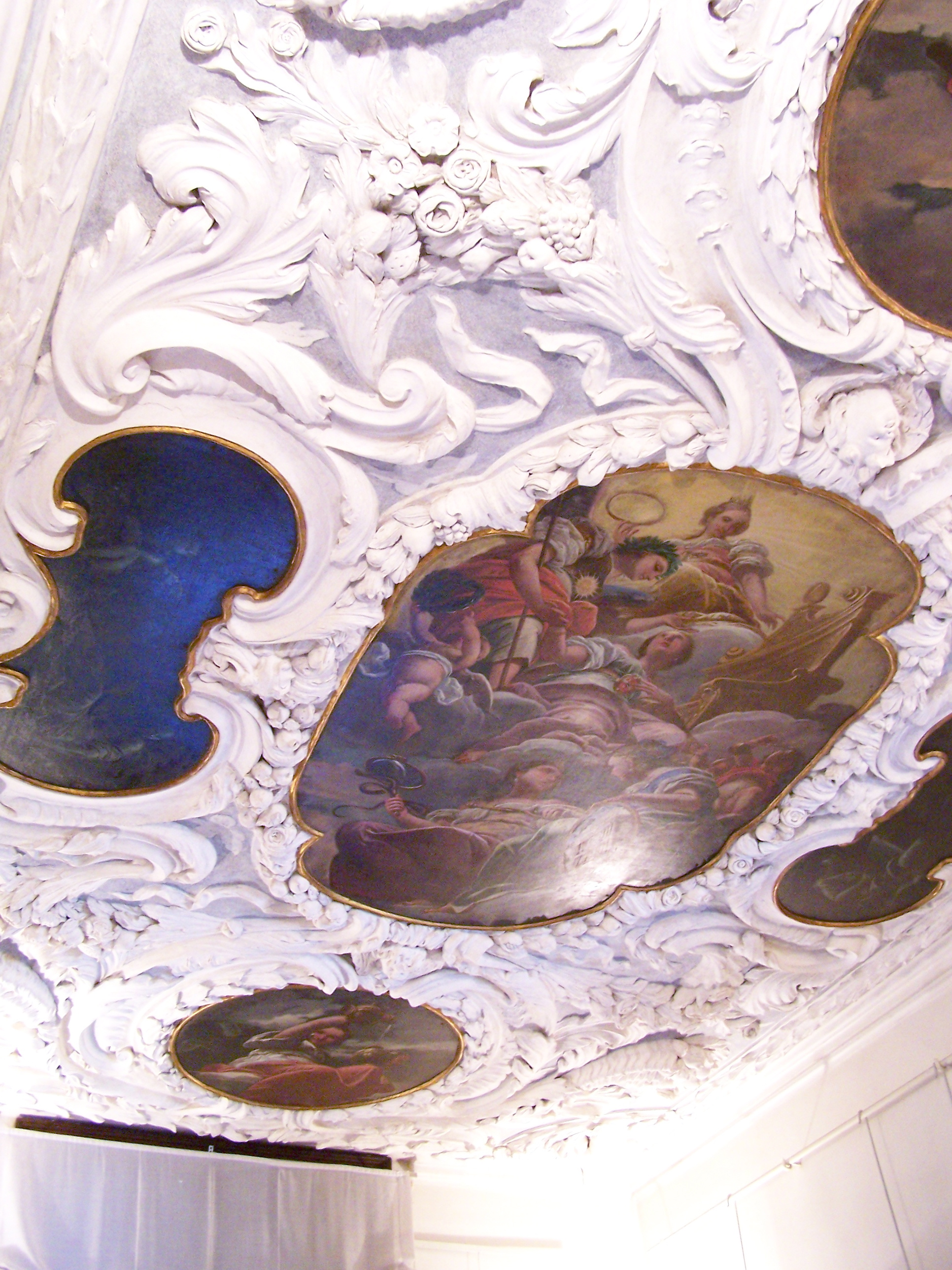
Ceiling fresco paintings and ornamental stucco

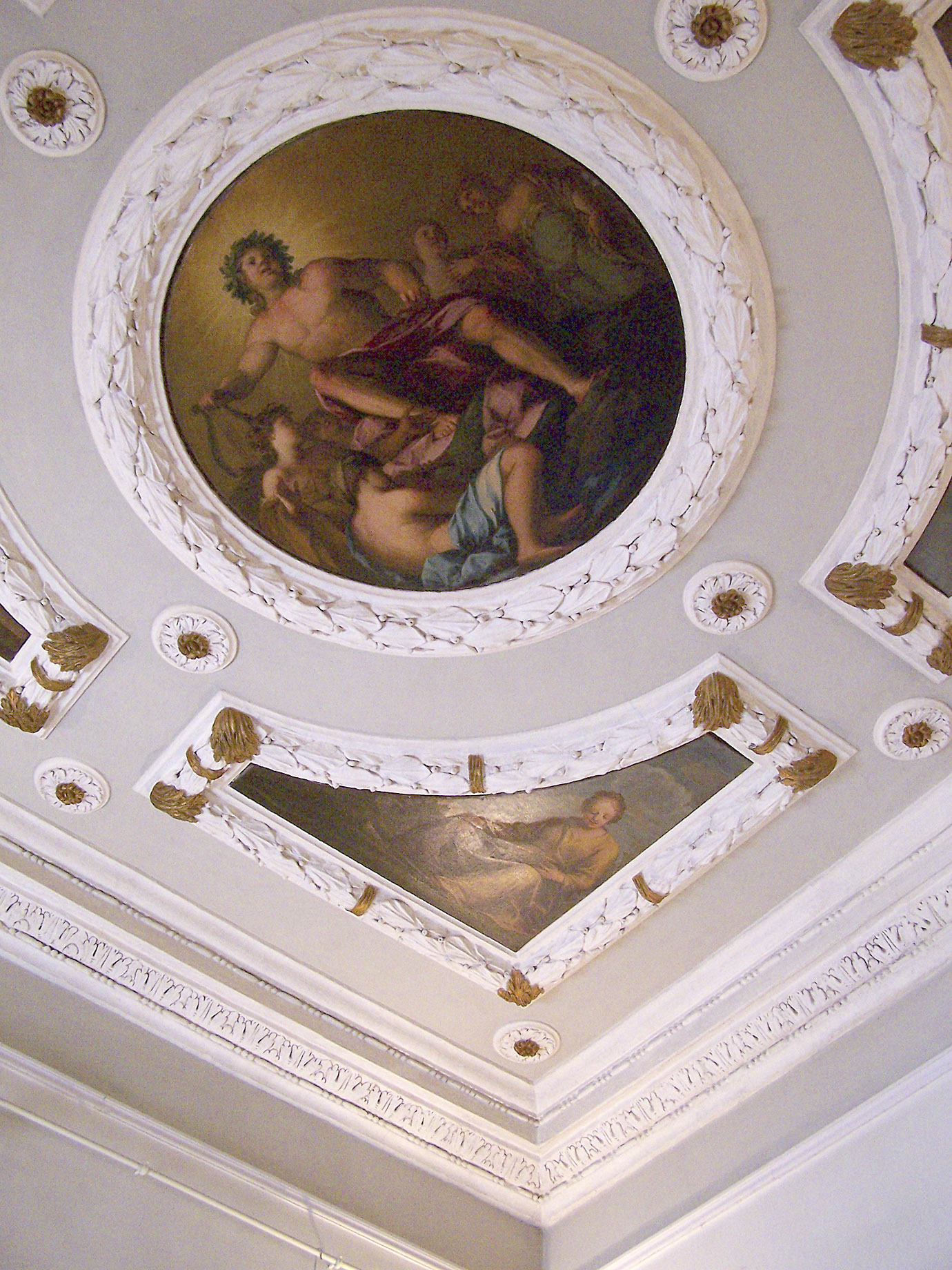
Intricate ceiling coffers and frescos

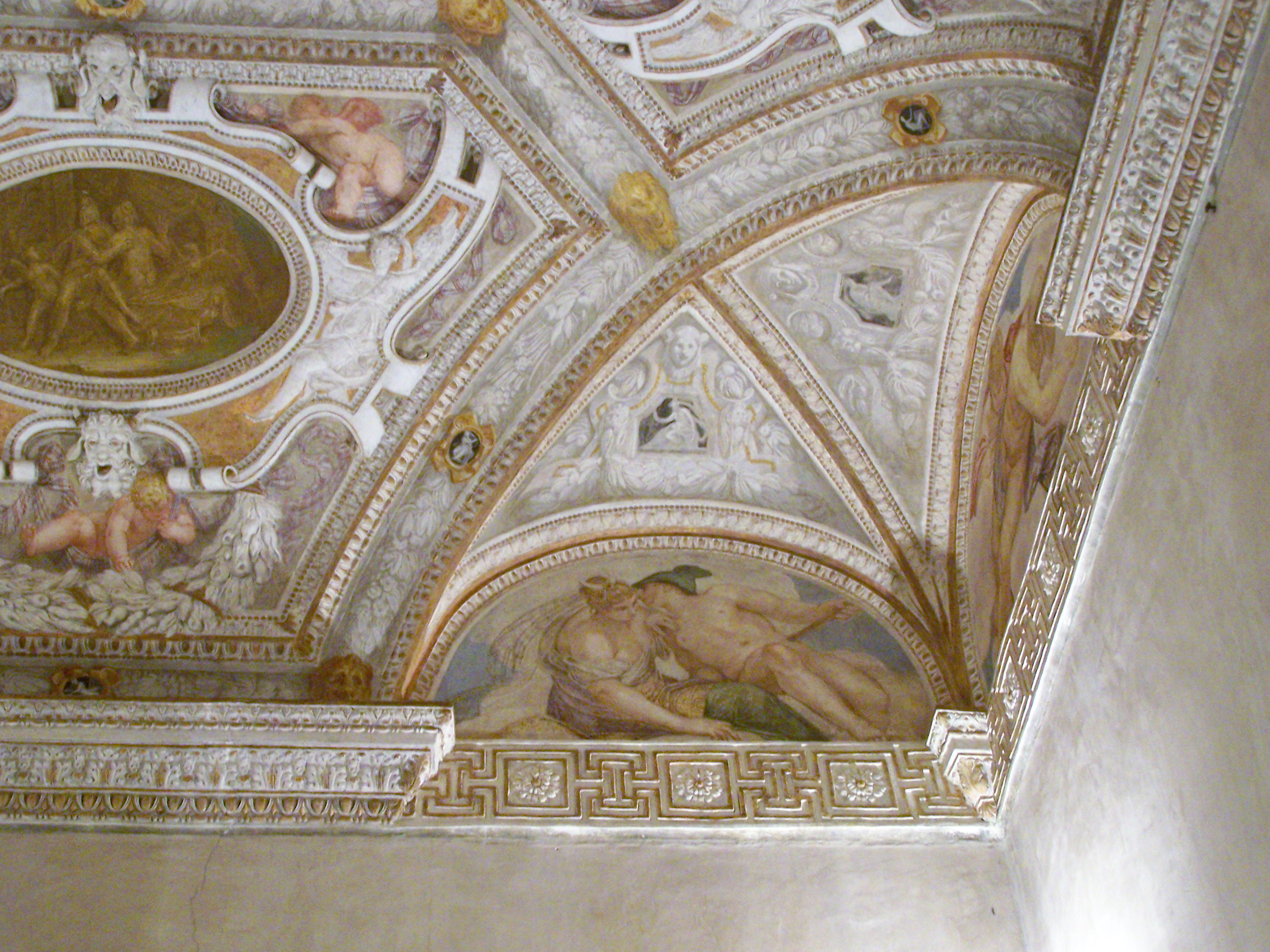
