= List of palaces of Vicenza =

Palaces in Vicenza, Italy

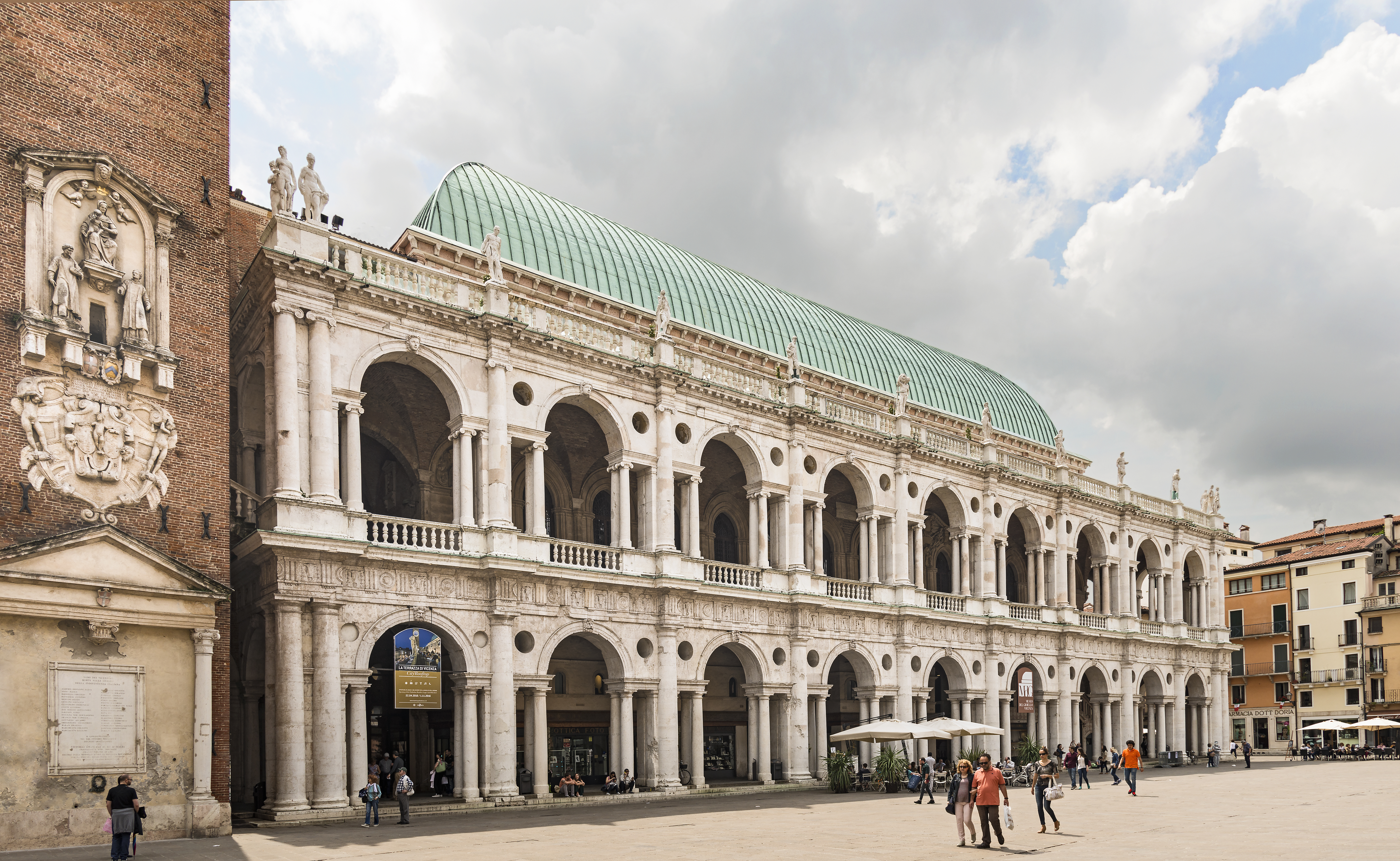
The Basilica Palladiana

Vicenza, Italy is a city renowned for its wealth of palaces and residences, which reflect the diverse artistic, architectural, and urban phases of its history. These structures are particularly associated with the work of the 16th-century architect Andrea Palladio.

This page provides an alphabetical list of Vicenza's civic buildings. It includes:

- Identification of each building, including its precise name, address, and geographic coordinates.
- Brief historical and artistic details.
- Indication of buildings no longer extant (in italics).

== UNESCO World Heritage designation ==
In 1994, 23 Palladian monuments in the historic centre of Vicenza (along with three Palladian villas in the suburbs) were inscribed on the UNESCO World Heritage List under the designation "Vicenza, City of Palladio". Of these 23 buildings, 16 are palaces, while the remaining seven are: the Arco delle Scalette, the Teatro Olimpico, the Loggia Valmarana in the Giardini Salvi, the dome and north portal of the Cathedral, the Church of Santa Maria Nova, and the Valmarana Chapel in the Church of Santa Corona.

The 16 palaces are:

- Basilica Palladiana
- Palazzo Barbaran da Porto
- Palazzo del Capitaniato or Palazzo del Capitanio
- Palazzetto Capra sul Corso, incorporated into Palazzo Piovini
- Palazzo Chiericati (housing the civic art gallery)
- Palazzo Civena Trissino (now the Eretenia clinic)
- Casa Cogollo, known as Casa del Palladio
- Palazzo da Monte, now Migliorini
- Palazzo Garzadori, now Bortolan
- Palazzo Porto Festa
- Palazzo Porto Breganze (now the headquarters of Telecom Italia)
- Palazzo Pojana
- Palazzo Schio
- Palazzo Thiene Bonin Longare (now the headquarters of Confindustria Vicenza)
- Palazzo Thiene (historic headquarters of the Banca Popolare di Vicenza)
- Palazzo Valmarana

== A ==
- Palazzo Alidosio Conti, at Corso Palladio 102–104, adjacent to the left of Palazzo Trissino Baston, extending its portico. 45.54784°N 11.54566°E

Vicenza's earliest Renaissance palace. The structure of the building and the style of the moldings suggest that it was built in the late 15th century, influenced by Lorenzo da Bologna. It passed from the Alidosio to the Conti family in the early 16th century. The first and second floors now house municipal offices, internally connected to Palazzo Trissino.
- Palazzo Angiolello, in Piazzetta Duomo, at the corner of Contrà Vescovado, a late 16th-century building in the Scamozzian style, destroyed by bombings on 14 May 1944.
- Palazzo Anti, at Contrà Vescovado 18. 45.54561°N 11.54220°E

=== Angaran palaces ===
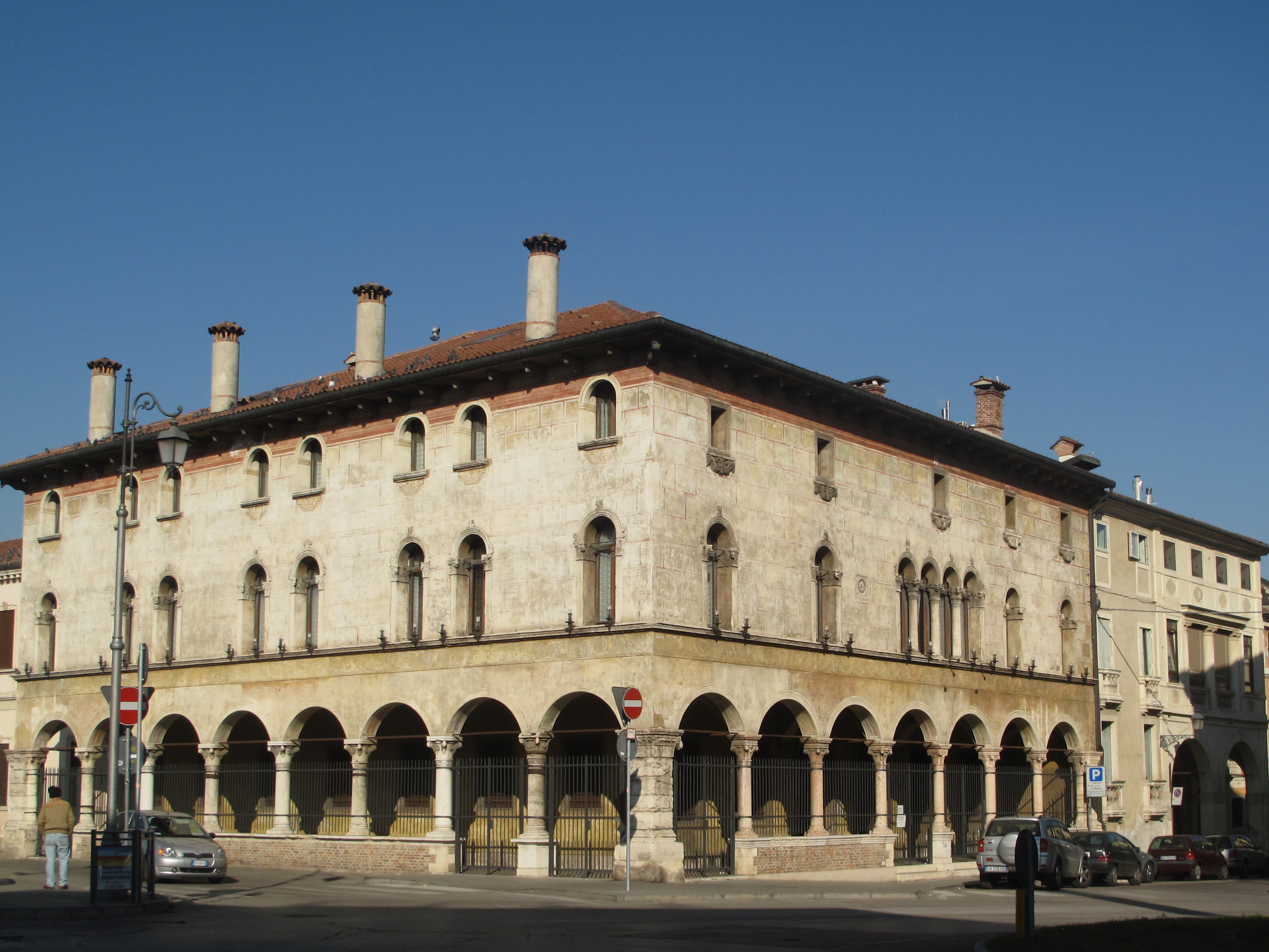
Palazzo Angaran in Piazza XX Settembre

The Angaran were a noble Vicentine family whose medieval estates centred around Angarano (now a suburb of Bassano del Grappa), from which they took their name. They joined the Venetian patriciate in 1655 after paying 100,000 ducats to fund the Cretan War.

- Palazzo Angaran, in Piazza XX Settembre, opposite Ponte degli Angeli, at the corner of Contrà Torretti and Contrà Santa Lucia (formerly Borgo di San Pietro, now Borgo Santa Lucia). 45.550519°N 11.550725°E

Built around 1480 for the Magrè family, possibly designed by Tommaso Formenton; faithfully rebuilt between 1921 and 1934.
A fine example of early Renaissance architecture, it is the only palace in Vicenza with two facades on a continuous portico.

- Palazzo Angaran, at Contrà San Marco 39 → Palazzo Schio Vaccari Lioy Angaran.
- Palazzo Angaran alle Fontanelle, designed in the early 18th century by Francesco Muttoni in Contrà delle Fontanelle (now Via IV Novembre, Borgo di San Pietro), no longer extant.

A typical example of minor Venetian architecture from the second half of the 18th century.

=== Arnaldi palaces ===
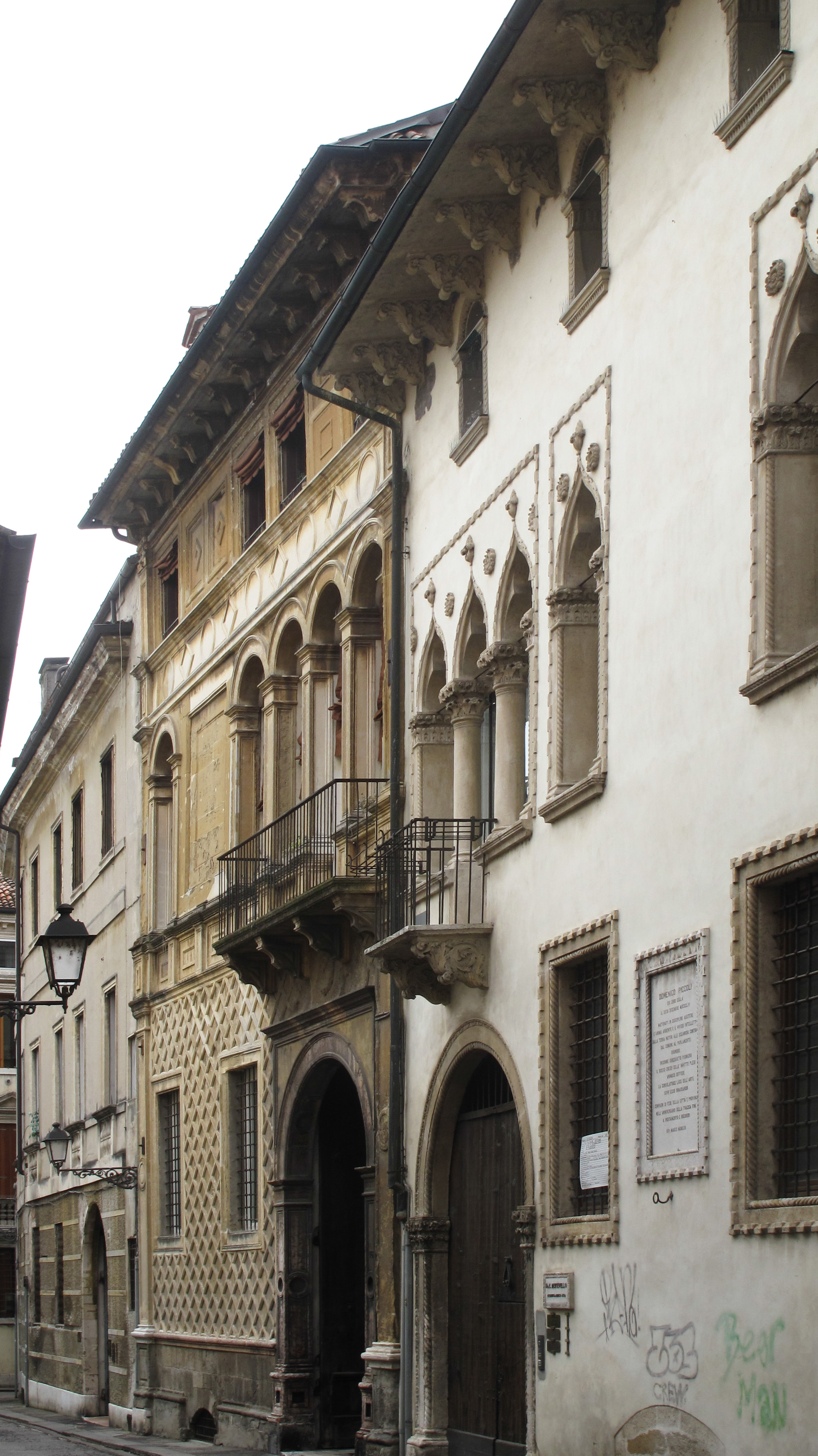
Palazzo Arnaldi Tretti (left) and Palazzo Godi Arnaldi (right) in Contrà Pasini

The Arnaldi were a noble Vicentine family, admitted to the Venetian patriciate and counted among the so-called Case fatte per soldo (houses made for money). They owned palaces in the city from the 15th to the 19th centuries.

- Palazzo Arnaldi, at Contrà Pasini 14 → Palazzo Godi Arnaldi Segala, now Bertevello.
- Palazzo Arnaldi Tretti, now Piccoli, at Contrà Pasini 16, adjacent to the former. 45.545143°N 11.545026°E

Built in the last quarter of the 15th century (with evidence of Lorenzo da Bologna's involvement), it features a refined Renaissance facade with a red marble portal, diamond-pattern cladding, and mouldings in red Nanto stone.

- Palazzo Arnaldi Della Torre, at Contrà Santi Apostoli. 45.544952°N 11.547058°E

Construction, attributed to Giandomenico Scamozzi, began in 1574; its neoclassical facade overlooks a spacious courtyard.

- Palazzo Arnaldi Piovene, at Contrà Zanella → Palazzo Sesso Piovene.
- Palazzo Arnaldi, at Contrà San Paolo 13 → Palazzo Bissari Arnaldi.
- Palazzetto Arnaldi, at Contrà del Pozzetto 5 → Palazzetto Chiericati Arnaldi.

== B ==
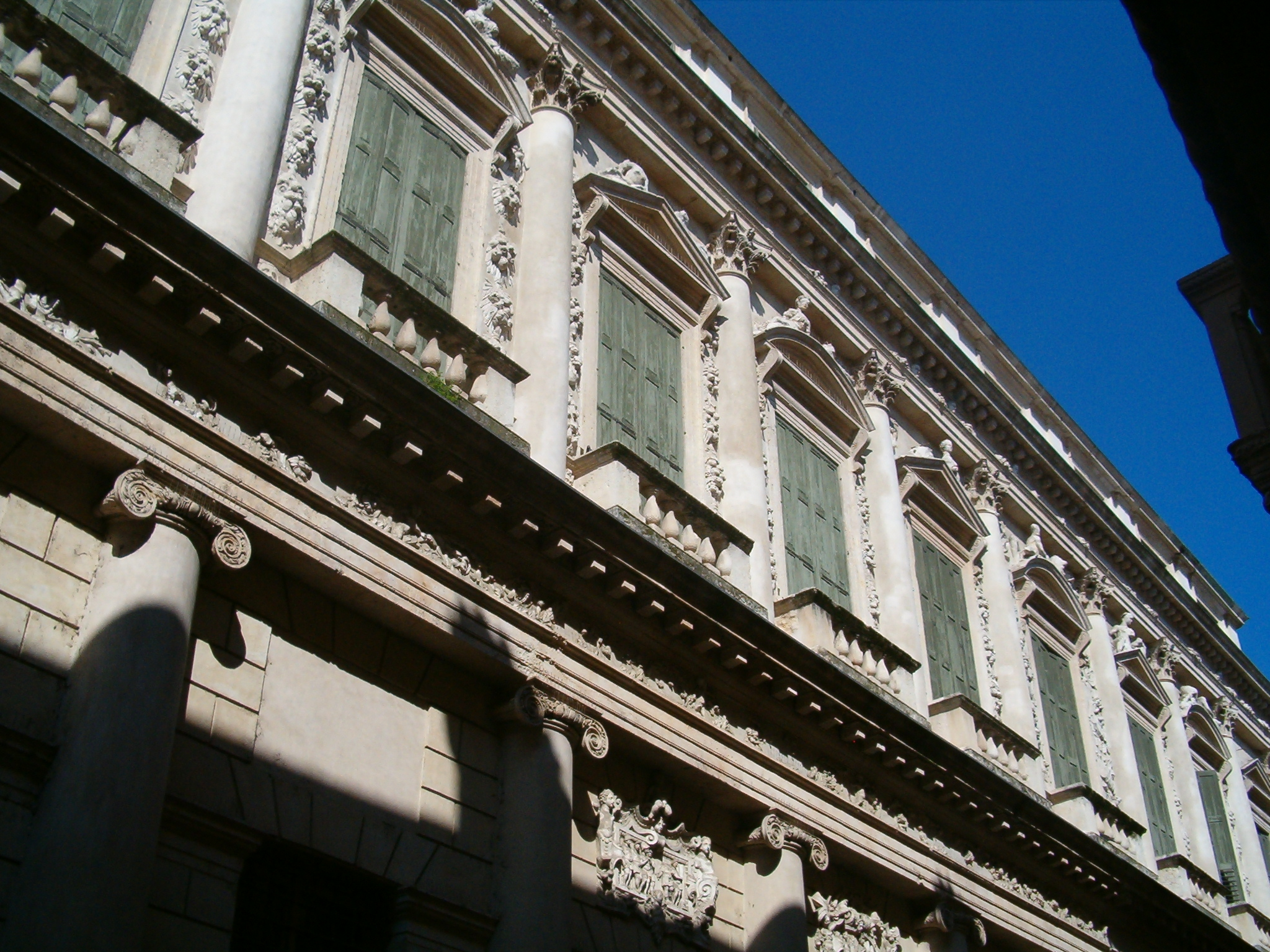
Palazzo Barbaran da Porto

- Palazzetto Balzafiori, at Piazza Matteotti 16.

An early 19th-century building by David Rossi.

- Palazzo Barbaran da Porto, at Contrà Porti 11. 45.54861°N 11.54555°E

Built in Vicenza between 1570 and 1575 by architect Andrea Palladio. It currently houses the Centro Internazionale di Studi di Architettura Andrea Palladio (CISA) and the Palladio Museum.

- Palazzo Barbieri, in Borgo Porta Nova.

Constructed in 1799 by Carlo Barrera.

- Palazzo Barbieri Vajenti Piovene Cicogna, at Contrà San Marco 41. 45.55185°N 11.54344°E

Built in the 17th century by Giacomo Borella; its entrance portal is crowned by an ornate Baroque balcony flanked by neoclassical windows.

- Basilica Palladiana, in Piazza dei Signori. 45.54694°N 11.54639°E

Andrea Palladio redesigned the Palazzo della Ragione, adding iconic white marble loggias with Serlian windows to the pre-existing Gothic structure.
Once the seat of Vicenza's public magistrates, it now hosts multiple exhibition spaces for art and architecture displays. It has been a UNESCO World Heritage Site since 1994.

=== Bissari buildings ===
The Bissari were a prominent family in Vicenza from the 13th to the 19th century, when their influence waned. They governed several fiefs and estates, notably the fief of Costa Fabrica, now Costabissara.

- Palazzo Bissari Malvezzi, in Corso Palladio.

Renovated by Camillo Bissari in 1696, its attribution is uncertain.

- Palazzo Bissari, now a large condominium, rebuilt after World War II bombings on the site of the Bissari's 16th-century residence; entrance at Contrà Vescovado 6.
- Palazzo Bissari Arnaldi, at Contrà San Paolo 13. 45.546331°N 11.547435°E

Commissioned by the Bissari in the late 15th century in Renaissance style (the fine portal remains), with 16th-century modifications; sold to the Arnaldi family in 1584. The humanist Enea Arnaldi died here.

- See also Torre Bissara, or Torre di Piazza, in Piazza dei Signori. 45.54732°N 11.54690°E

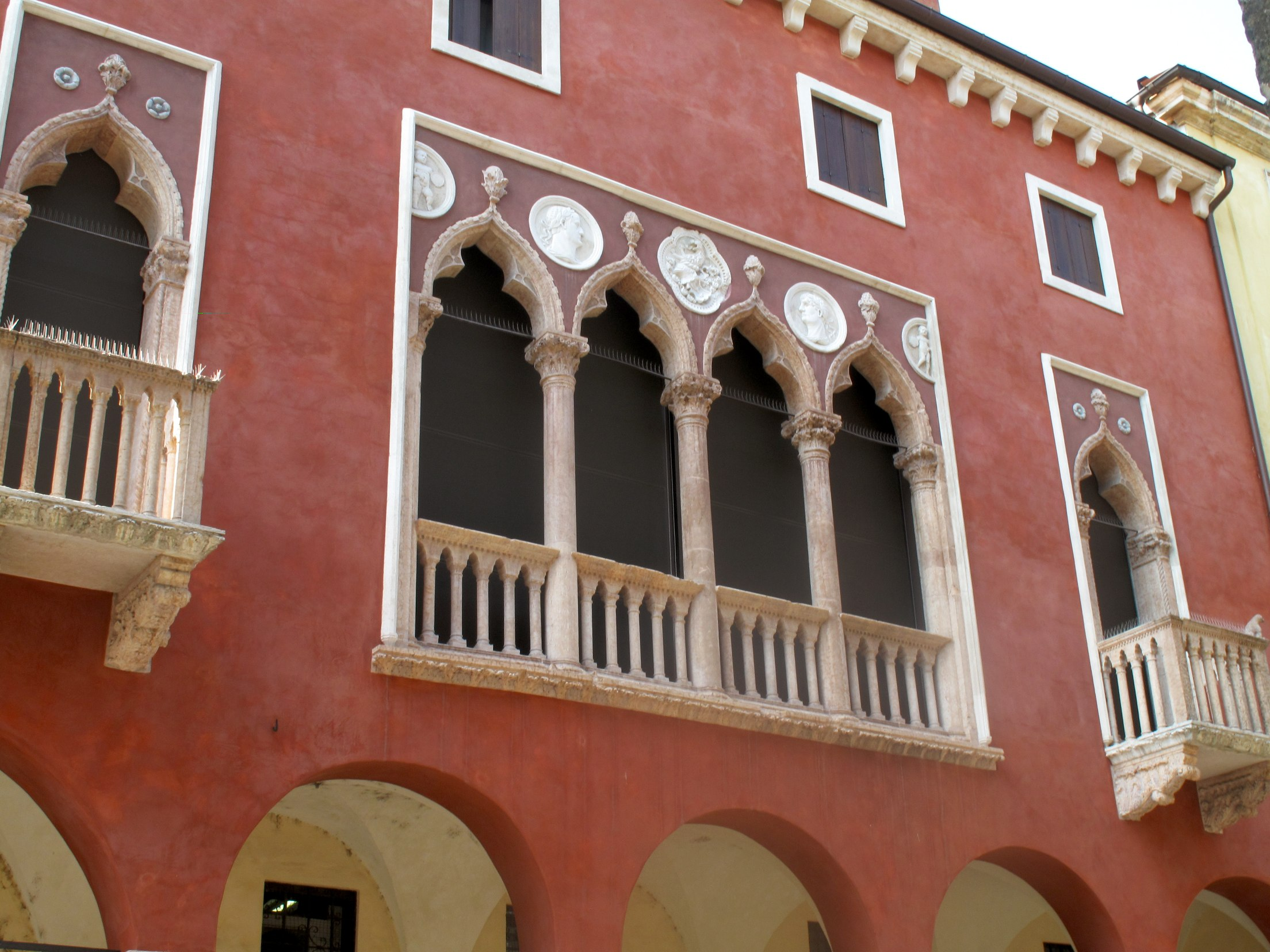
Palazzo Braschi

- Palazzo Bollina Sola, at Contrà Canove.

An early 18th-century building.

- Palazzo Bonin, at Contrà Lodi (Borgo Porta Nova).
- Palazzo Braghetta Pagello, in Corso Palladio.

Built in 1780 by Ottavio Bertotti Scamozzi.

- Palazzo Braschi, also known as Casino dei Nobili or Casino Vecchio, in Corso Palladio. 45.54746°N 11.54445°E

A late Gothic stately residence, partially rebuilt after bombing in 1945.

=== Breganze palaces ===
- Palazzetto Breganze, at Contrà Porti 5–7.

A mid-16th-century building.

- Palazzo Breganze, at Contrà Porti 17 → Palazzo da Porto Breganze.
- Palazzo Breganze in Piazza Castello → Palazzo da Porto Breganze in Piazza Castello.
- Palazzo Breganze, opposite Porton del Luzo → Palazzo Pigafetta Breganze.

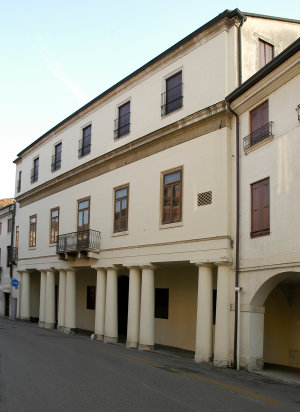
Palazzo Brusarosco

- Palazzo Brusarosco Gallo, at Contrà Porta Santa Croce 3 (Borgo Porta Nova). 45.551272°N 11.538278°E

A 19th-century building, partially restored by architect Carlo Scarpa, who designed Casa Gallo on the top floor. It houses the international Library La Vigna – Centre for Culture and Rural Civilisation.

== C ==
- Ca' d’Oro → Palazzo Caldogno Dal Toso Franceschini da Schio, known as Ca' d’Oro

=== Caldogno palaces ===
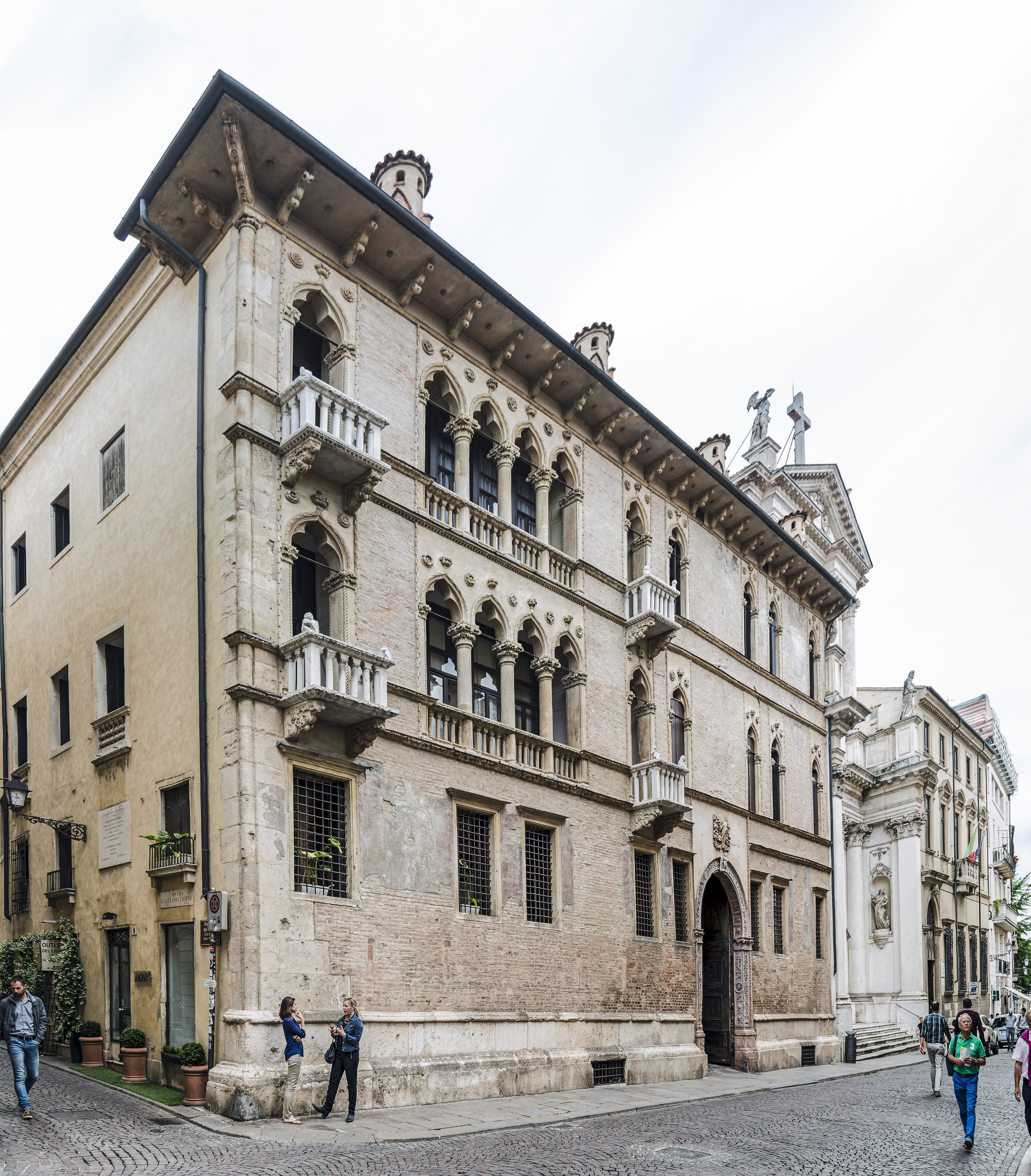
Palazzo Caldogno Dal Toso Franceschini da Schio, known as Ca' d’Oro, facade

The Caldogno were a noble Vicentine family tied to the municipality of Caldogno in the Province of Vicenza, branching into various lines. At the height of their prominence, they maintained their primary residence in Vicenza and owned numerous properties across the Vicentine region.

- Palazzo Caldogno Dal Toso Franceschini da Schio, known as Ca' d’Oro, at Corso Palladio 147, corner of Contrà San Gaetano Thiene. 45.548423°N 11.546738°E

Built in the 14th century by the Caldogno family and completed in late Gothic style around 1477 by the Dal Toso family, who expanded it at the rear and finished the courtyard around 1500. The ground floor was remodelled by Lorenzo da Bologna, who crafted the elaborate portal; the atrium and interiors were renovated in the late 18th century. Destroyed by World War II bombings and subsequently rebuilt.

- Palazzo Caldogno Tecchio, in Corso Fogazzaro.

One of the city's most opulent buildings, constructed in the mid-16th century and entirely rebuilt after World War II, it now serves as the Chamber of Commerce.

- Palazzo Caldogno Curti, at Contrà Riale.

Extensively remodelled in the 18th century, now in a state of disrepair.

- Case Caldogno, demolished, on the site now occupied by Palazzo Loschi Zileri Dal Verme, in Corso Palladio.

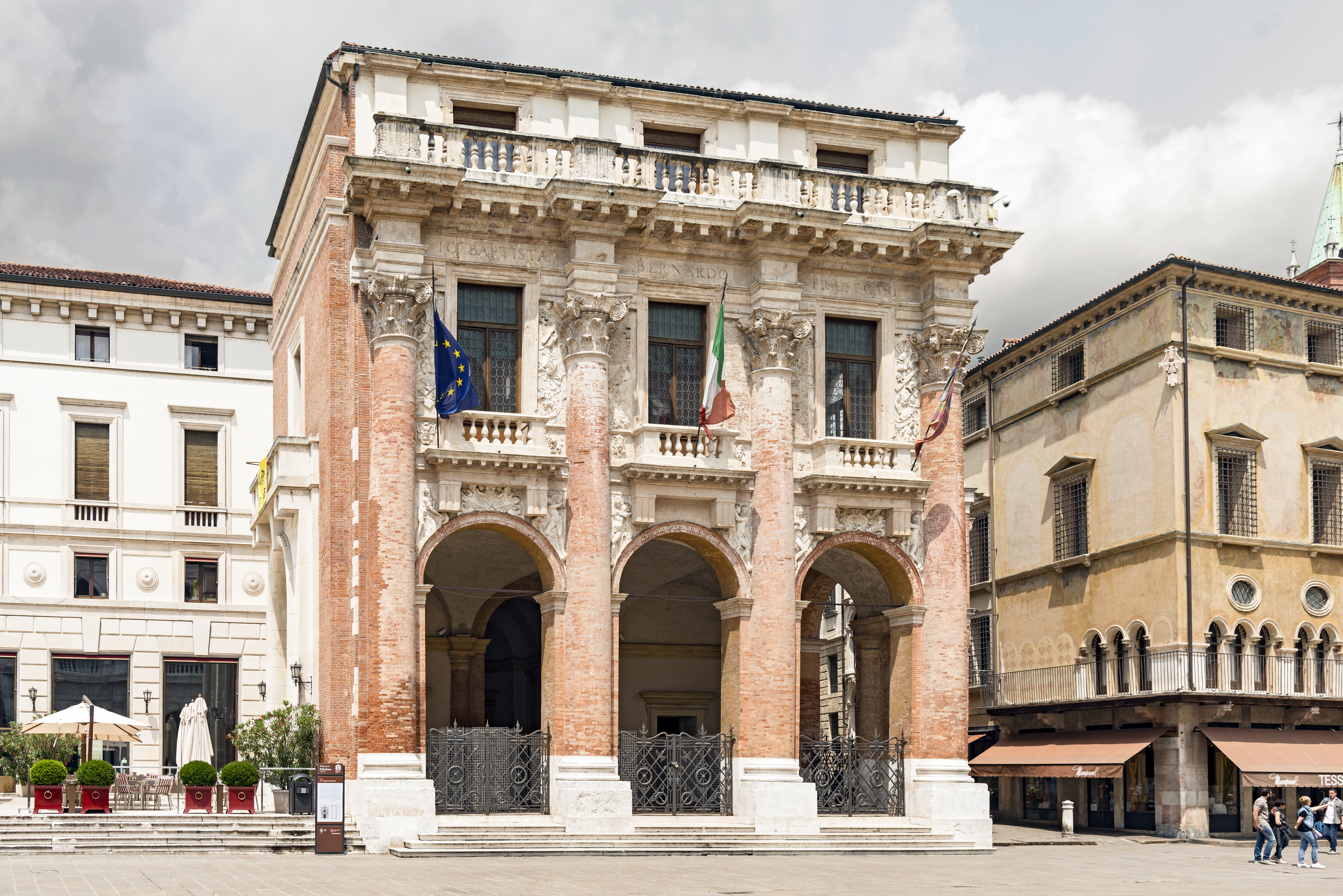
Palazzo del Capitaniato

- Palazzo del Capitaniato, also known as Palazzo del Capitanio or Loggia Bernarda, in Piazza dei Signori. 45.54722°N 11.54583°E

Designed in 1565 by Andrea Palladio, built between 1571 and 1572. Decorated externally by Lorenzo Rubini, with interior paintings by Giovanni Antonio Fasolo. It currently houses the city's municipal council.

=== Capra palaces ===
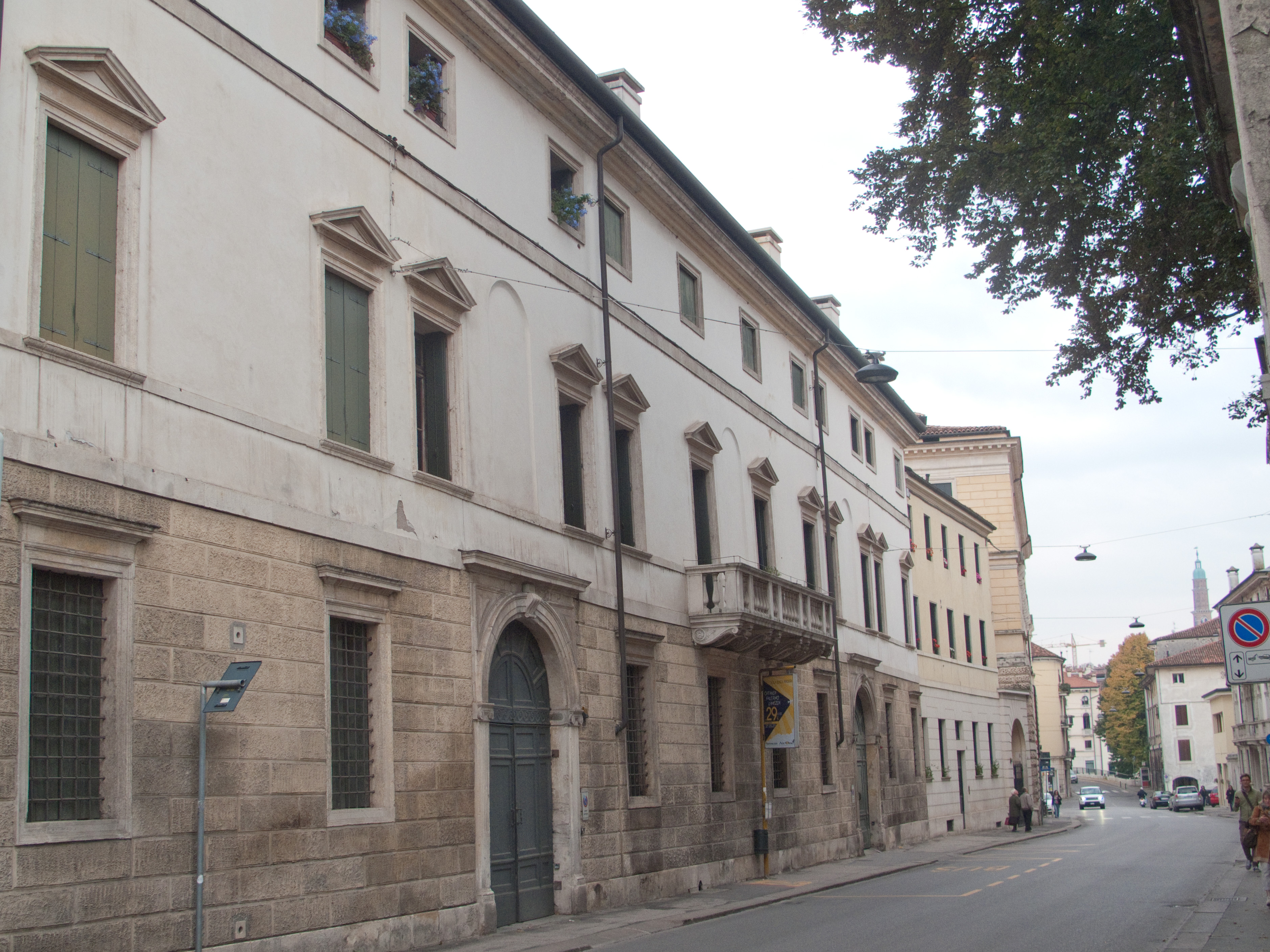
Palazzo Capra Querini

The Capra were an ancient family belonging to Vicenza's Noble Council. The family's progenitor, Enrico Capra, made significant land acquisitions in the Vicentine territory of Carrè in the early 11th century.

- Palazzo Capra, an 18th-century building, in Piazzetta Santo Stefano, corner of Stradella Santo Stefano.

Adapted from a pre-existing structure in the mid-18th century and modified in the early 20th century to serve as the Post and Telegraph Office.

- Palazzo Capra Clementi, in Corso Palladio, corner of Stradella San Marcello. 45.546995°N 11.543175°E

An early Vicentine Renaissance building.

- Palazzo Capra Conti, a 17th-century building, in Contrà Santo Stefano, corner of Stradella Santa Corona. 45.54968°N 11.54732°E

Constructed in the early 17th century, possibly by Ottavio Bruto Revese.

- Palazzo Capra Querini Rezzara, at Contrà San Marco 36–38. 45.5521°N 11.5435°E

Featuring a long, plain facade originally adorned with frescoes. Beyond the palace, crossing a stone bridge over the Astichello, lies Parco Querini, which served as the palace's garden. Acquired by the Rezzara counts, the park was opened to the public in 1971 after prolonged disputes over its use.

- Palazzetto Capra sul Corso, in Corso Palladio. 45.546334°N 11.541743°E

Designed by Andrea Palladio, now incorporated into the side of Palazzo Piovini. It is included in the list of Vicenza's 23 Palladian monuments.

- Palazzetto Capra Lampertico, in Corso Palladio, adjacent to Palazzo Lampertico.

Designed by Ottone Calderari and built posthumously in the early 19th century.

- Palazzo Capra in Piazzetta Santo Stefano → Palazzo Sale Capra.

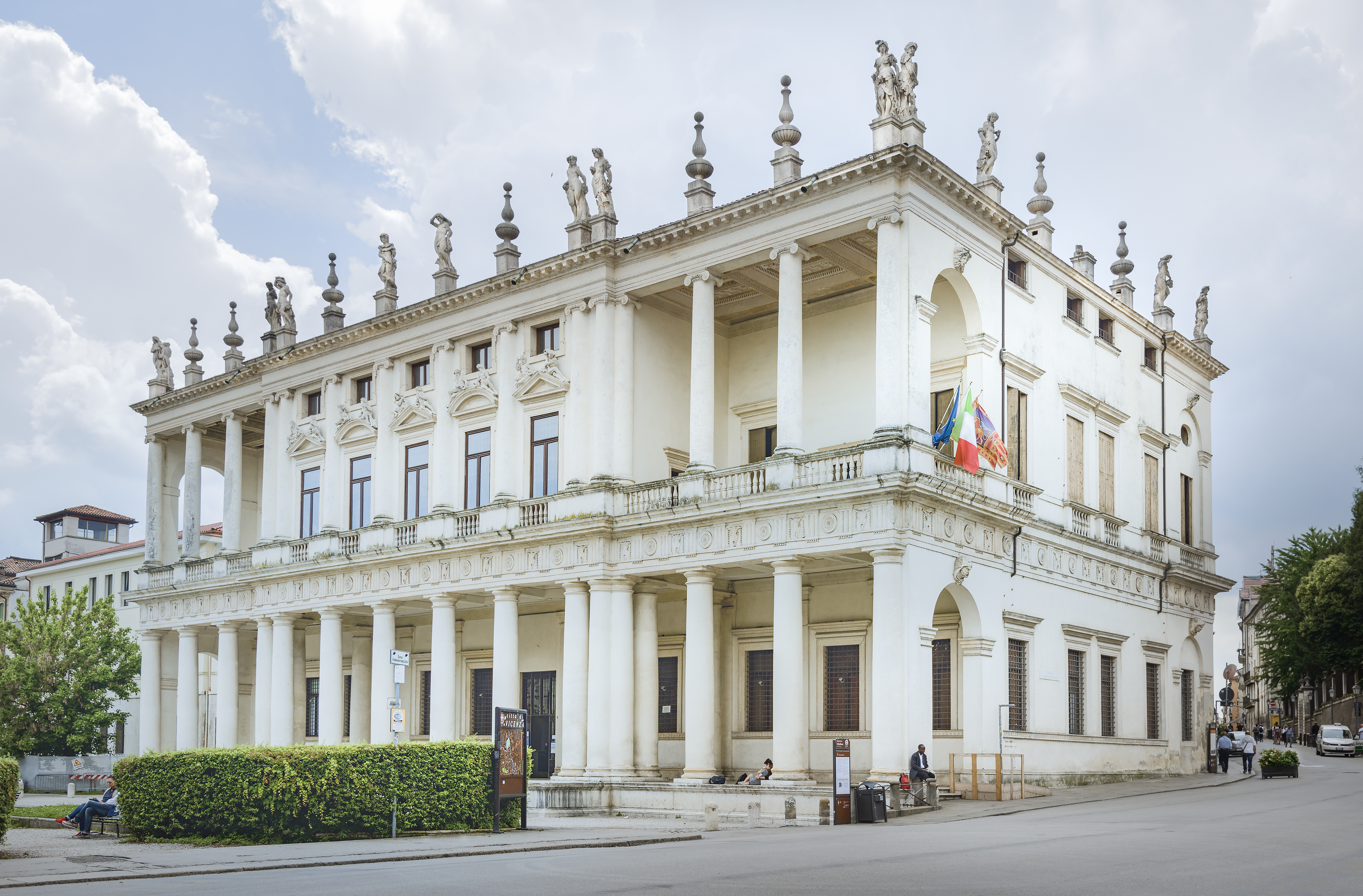
Palazzo Chiericati

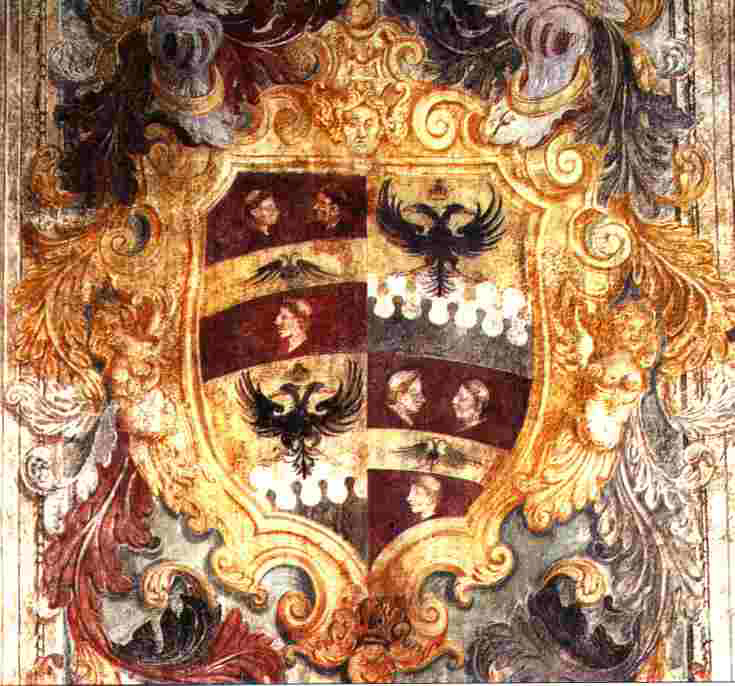
Coat of arms of the Chiericati family

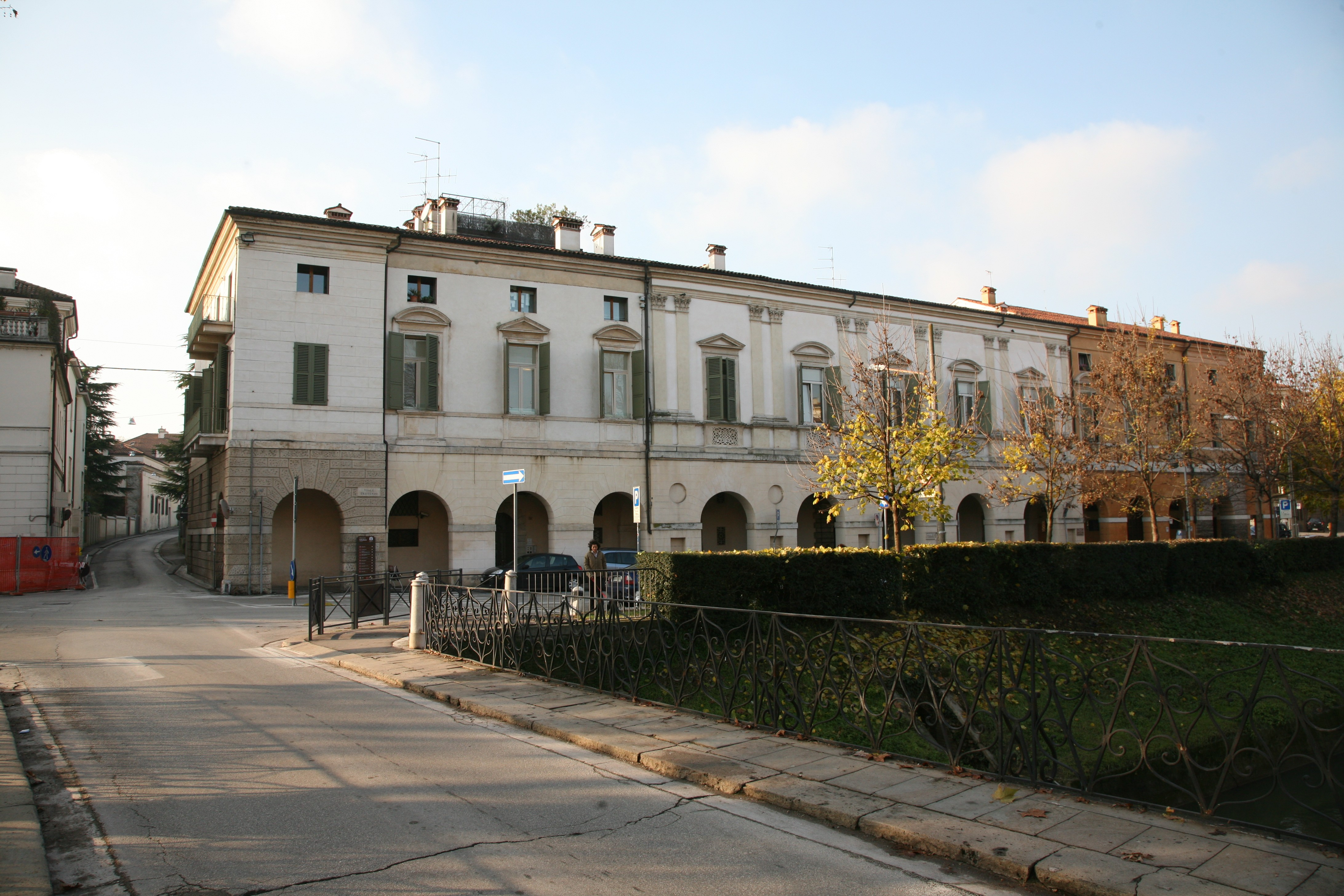
Palazzo Civena Trissino

- Casa Chemello, at Contrà Lioy, no longer extant.
- Palazzo Chiericati, in Piazza Matteotti. 45.549123°N 11.549404°E

A Renaissance building, designed in 1550 as a noble residence for the Chiericati counts by Andrea Palladio and constructed from 1551, completed only at the end of the 17th century. It has housed the civic museum since 1855 and is a UNESCO World Heritage Site since 1994.

- Palazzetto Chiericati Arnaldi, at Contrà Pozzetto 5.

A late 16th-century building, replicating the facade scheme of Palazzo Trissino.

- Palazzo Civena Trissino, at Viale Eretenio (Eretenia clinic). 45.543633°N 11.545901°E

Built in 1540 for the brothers Giovanni Giacomo, Pier Antonio, Vincenzo, and Francesco Civena by Palladio, it is his first city palace. Later it became the residence of the Trissino dal Vello d’Oro counts, who had it significantly expanded by Domenico Cerato, adding lateral wings. It is among the Palladian monuments designated as a UNESCO World Heritage Site.

- Palazzo Cividale, in Corso Fogazzaro.

Constructed in 1582 and attributed to Vincenzo Scamozzi.

- Palazzo Colonnese, at Contrà Santa Barbara.

A Gothic-style building, remodelled in the late 15th century.

- Palazzetto Colzè Trissino, in Corso Palladio.

A Gothic-style building, remodelled in the late 15th century.

- Palazzetto Conti, at Stradella Santa Corona.

Typical of the late 15th century, partially destroyed by 1944 bombings.

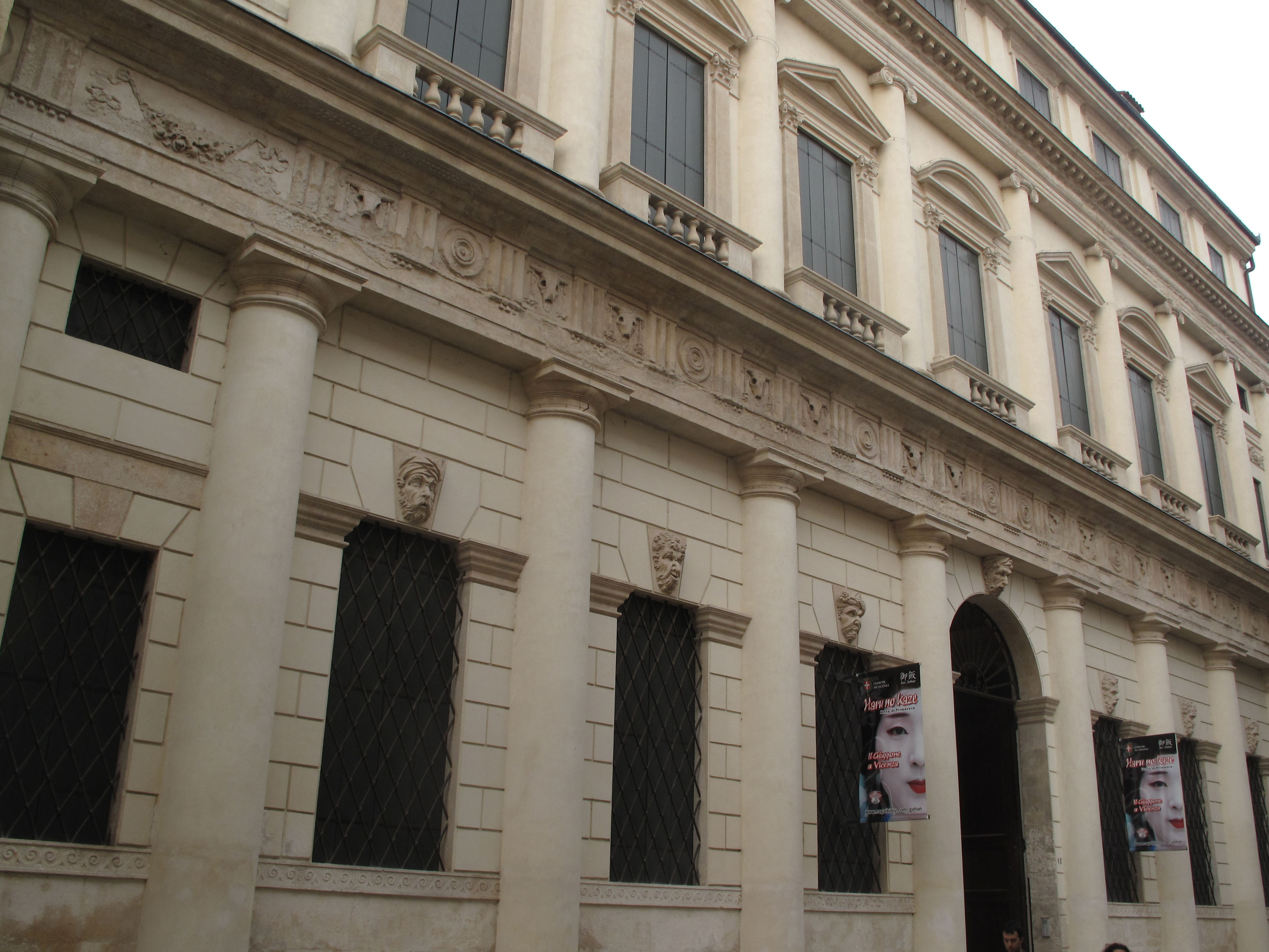
Palazzo Cordellina

Coat of arms of the Cordellina family

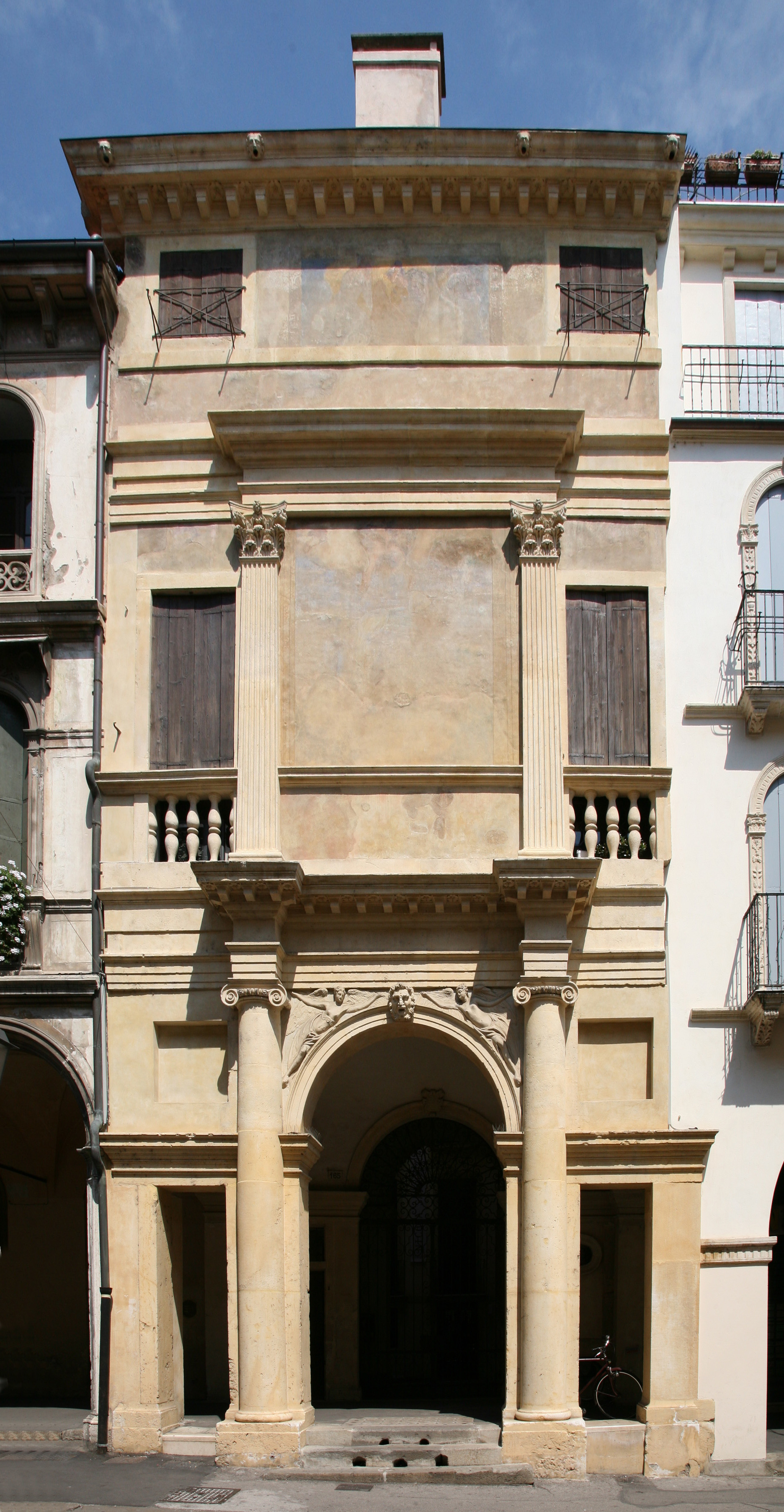
Casa Cogollo, known as "Casa del Palladio"

- Palazzo Cordellina, at Contrà Riale. 45.548410°N 11.544077°E

Built in Palladian style by Ottone Calderari on commission from the jurist Carlo Cordellina.

- Palazzetto Cordellina, at Stradella Piancoli.

Built in 1738–40 by Carlo Cordellina. The designer is unknown.

- Casa Cogollo, known as Casa del Palladio, in Corso Palladio. 45.549256°N 11.548781°E

Built in 1559 for a notary and attributed to Andrea Palladio, it is included in Vicenza's 23 Palladian monuments listed as a UNESCO World Heritage Site since 1994.

- Palazzo Costantini, at Contrà Riale 13. 45.548257°N 11.543831°E

Built in 1840 based on a design by Giovanni Maria Negrin Quartesan, it is one of the locations of the Biblioteca Civica Bertoliana.

- Palazzetto Crico, in Piazza delle Erbe.

A refined neoclassical palace.

== D ==
- Palazzo Da Monte, at Contrà Santa Corona 9. 45.54952°N 11.54909°E

Included in the list of Palladian palaces protected by UNESCO, though some scholars consider it apocryphal to Palladio. Built opposite the Dominican convent of Santa Corona between 1550 and 1554, it was completed in 1581, a year after Palladio's death.

- Casa Dal Corso, in Corso Fogazzaro, corner of Contrà Riale.

The building retains a late Gothic trifora.

- Casa Dal Giglio.

Designed by Ottavio Bertotti Scamozzi.

- Palazzo Dalesmani, at Contrà Mure San Michele, no longer extant.
- Casa de Ferrari, at Contrà Ponte Furo.

Designed by Ottavio Bertotti Scamozzi.

- Casa Dolfi, in Corso Fogazzaro.

Renovated in the late 16th century from a pre-existing 15th-century building.

- Casa Donà, at Contrà Mure San Rocco.

Designed by Bartolomeo Malacarne.

- Palazzetto Doni Lioy, at Contrà Lioy.

A building with Gothic and Renaissance elements, it was the residence of statesman Paolo Lioy.

- Istituto delle Dorotee, at Contrà San Domenico.

Designed by Antonio Piovene and built in 1844–45.

== E ==
- Palazzetto Emiliano, at Contrà San Marco 4.

An early 16th-century building, attributable to Tommaso da Lugano.

== F ==
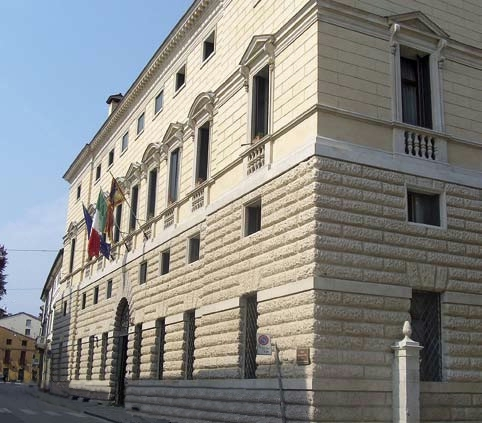
Palazzo Franceschini Folco

- Palazzo Fadinelli, at Contrà Zanella.

A refined mid-18th-century work by Giovanni Miazzi.

- Palazzetto Ferramosca Dal Toso, at Contrà Piancoli.

Renovated in the mid-16th century.

- Palazzo Ferrari, in Corso Fogazzaro.

Renovated in 1692 with further interventions in 1877–78.

- Casa dei Filippini (behind the church).
- Palazzo Fioccardo, at Contrà Santi Apostoli.

Built in 1800 based on a design by Carlo Barrera.

- Casa Fontana, in Piazza De Gasperi.

A 1930s building by Ettore Fagiuoli, blending classical and Baroque elements in a neo-Mannerist composition.

- Casa Fontanella, at Contrà Lodi (Borgo Porta Nova).

A 1799 building designed by Ottone Calderari.

- Palazzo Franceschini Folco, at Contrà San Marco 30. 45.55181°N 11.54383°E

An 18th-century building of significant proportions, with the ground floor and mezzanine in masonry and the piano nobile featuring narrow neoclassical windows with architraves, designed by Ottavio Bertotti Scamozzi. Now the seat of the Provincial Administration.

- Palazzetto Franceschini Piovene, at Contrà Porti 24.

Its facade, likely designed by Carlo Greco in 1820, reflects late Vicentine neoclassicism.

- Palazzo Franco, at Contrà Porta Padova (Borgo di San Pietro).

A 19th-century building designed by Antonio Piovene.

- Palazzo Franco, at Contrà Santa Lucia, corner of Piazza XX Settembre.

An early 18th-century building.

- Casa Fusinieri, at Contrà Santi Apostoli.

== G ==
- Casa Gallo → Palazzo Brusarosco Gallo.

=== Garzadori palaces ===
- Palazzo Garzadori al Brotton, built for Giambattista Garzadori, no longer extant.
- Palazzo Garzadori Fattore, at Contrà Lioy.

Built in the 1460s in flamboyant Gothic style; it retains its original portal and trifora.

- Palazzo Graziani Garzadori, at Contrà Piancoli 10/12. 45.5467°N 11.5484°E

Constructed in the mid-16th century at the request of Girolamo Garzadori, who sought to renovate houses inherited from his uncle Battista Graziani. Palladio may have been commissioned for a study, but the patron's death in 1567 halted the collaboration, though documentary evidence indicates part of the structure was built by 1564. Girolamo's son completed the building before Palladio's death; its compositional scheme aligns with similar Palladian structures. It is included among the Palladian palaces designated as a UNESCO World Heritage Site.

- Palazzo Garzadori, at Contrà Piancoli 2–4, corner of Contrà Ponte San Michele. 45.54657°N 11.54828°E

One of the city's most significant and well-preserved Gothic buildings, constructed around 1460, incorporating Romanesque structures.

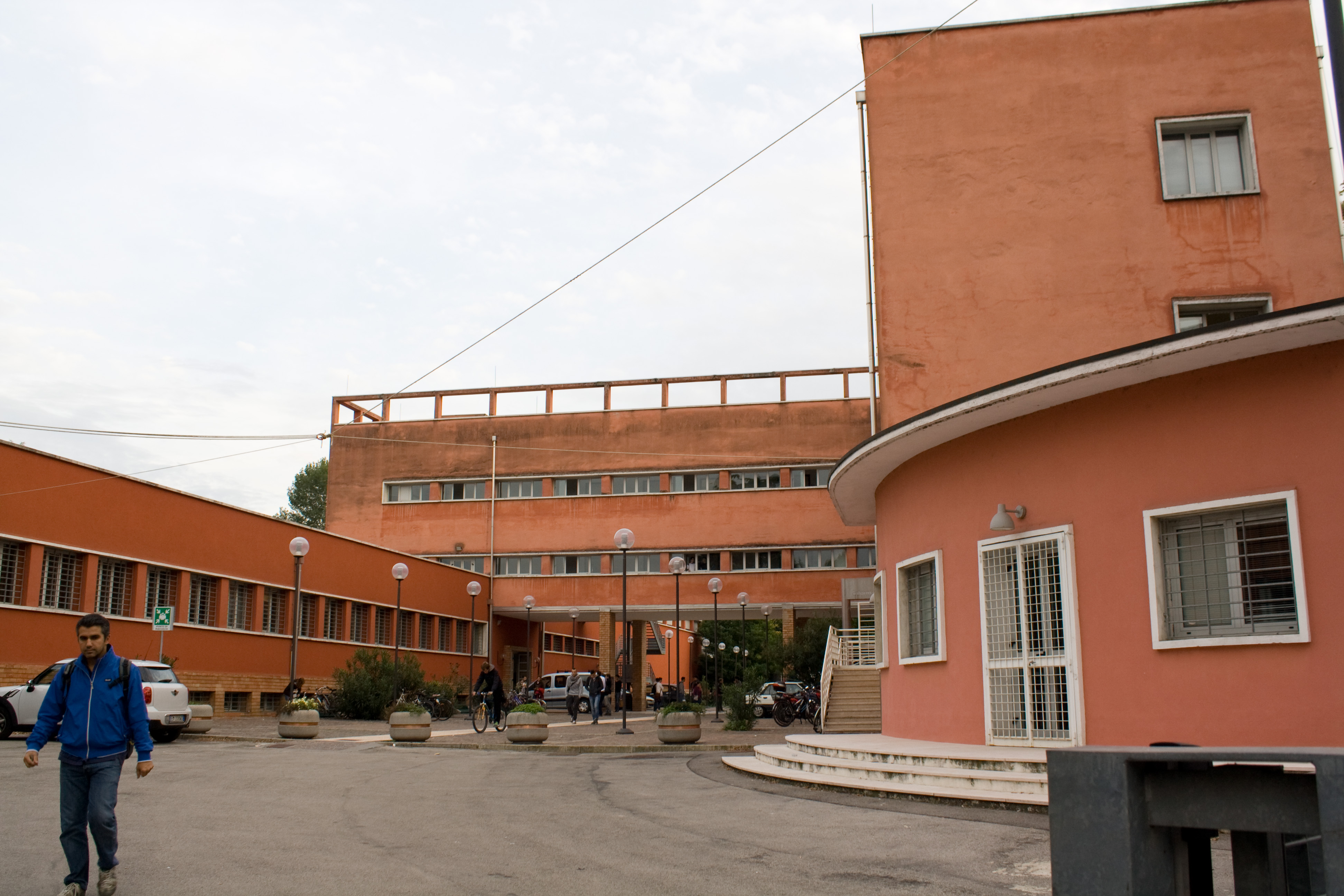
Entrance to former GIL Vicenza (now University of Vicenza)

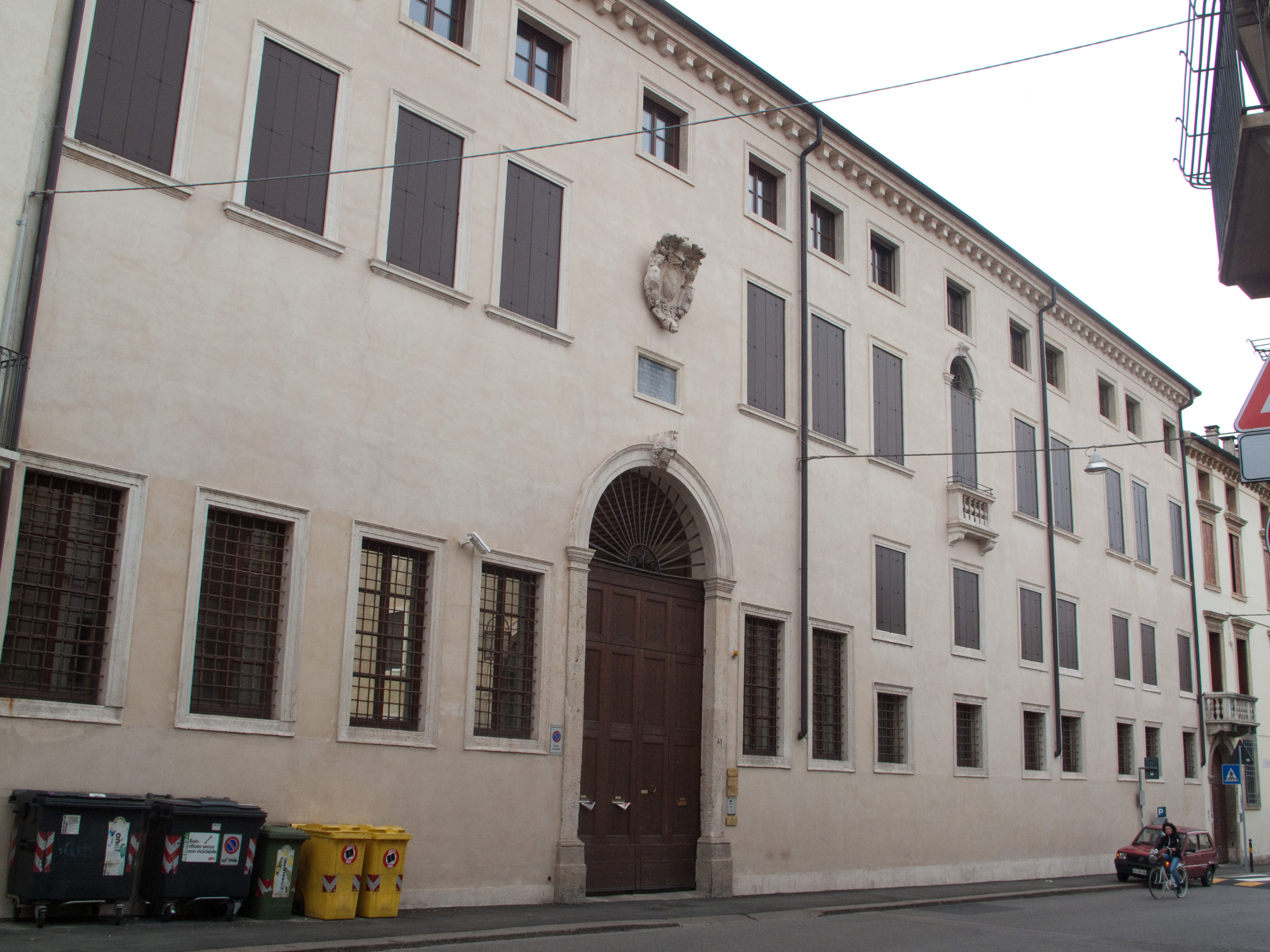
Palazzo Giustiniani Baggio

- Casa Gastaldi, at Contrà Santa Lucia, corner of Stradella dei Orbi.

Renovated in 1773 by Ottavio Bertotti Scamozzi.

- Palazzo Ghellini, at Contrà Oratorio dei Proti, corner of Contrà Sant’Antonio.

Likely designed by Antonio Pizzocaro, it was heavily damaged by World War II bombings and rebuilt in the 1950s.

- Palazzo Ghellini, at Contrà Pasini 10.

Commissioned by Ghellino Ghellini in 1570.

- Palazzo Ghislanzoni, in Corso Palladio, corner of Corso Fogazzaro.

An early 19th-century building, the only Vicentine work by architect Antonio Diedo.

- Palazzetto Giacomazzi, in Piazza Matteotti.

A rare example of Rococo architecture in Veneto, from the early 18th century.

- Palazzo San Giacomo, at Contrà Riale 5. 45.54837°N 11.54454°E

Formerly part of a convent, it has been the main seat of the Biblioteca Civica Bertoliana since 1910.

- Complesso ex GIL, at Contrà Barche. 45.5460°N 11.5505°E

Built in the 1930s for the Gioventù Italiana del Littorio, it now serves as a university campus; one building houses the Teatro Astra.

- Palazzo Giustiniani Baggio, at Contrà San Francesco 41. 45.55368°N 11.54237°E

Occupied by the Giustiniani until 1812, it passed to the Zorzi Giustiniani descendants, who sold it to Marco Baggio in the early 20th century. Later acquired by the Vicenza Civil Hospital and finally purchased by the Cariverona Foundation, which completed its restoration in 2011.

- Palazzo Godi Arnaldi Segala, now Bertevello, at Contrà Pasini 14. 45.545218°N 11.54494°E

In late Gothic style.

- Palazzo Godi Nievo, at Contrà Gazzolle.

Built in the early 17th century based on a design by Vincenzo Scamozzi and modified in the late 18th century by Ottone Calderari, it now serves as the Prefecture.

- Palazzetto Gonzati, at Contrà Apolloni 7.

Likely designed by Ottone Calderari in the 1810s.

=== Gualdi palaces ===
- Palazzi Gualdi, in Piazzetta Gualdi.

Two distinct early 16th-century buildings unified at the base.

- Palazzo Gualdo Cevese, at Contrà Lioy.

Originally Gothic, renovated in the mid-17th century.

- Palazzo Gualdo in Pusterla.

A lavish residence renovated in 1537.

- Palazzo Gualdo Dalle Ore, in Piazzetta San Giuseppe.

A work by Giovanni Miglioranza from the early 19th century.

- Palazzetto Gualdo Priorato, at Contrà Pasini.

Built in 1523.

== L ==
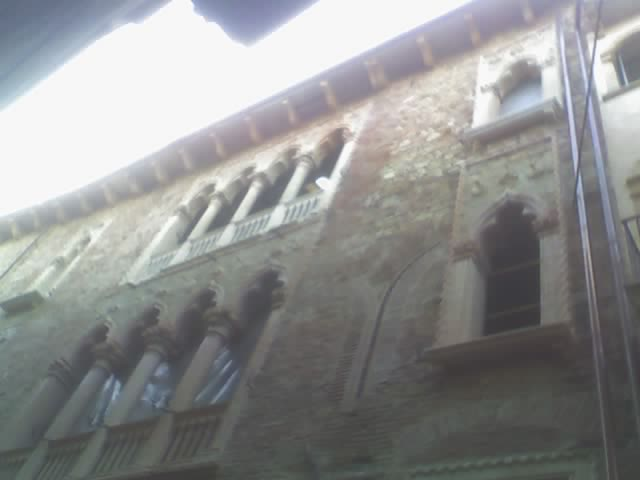
Palazzo Lanzè Sesso

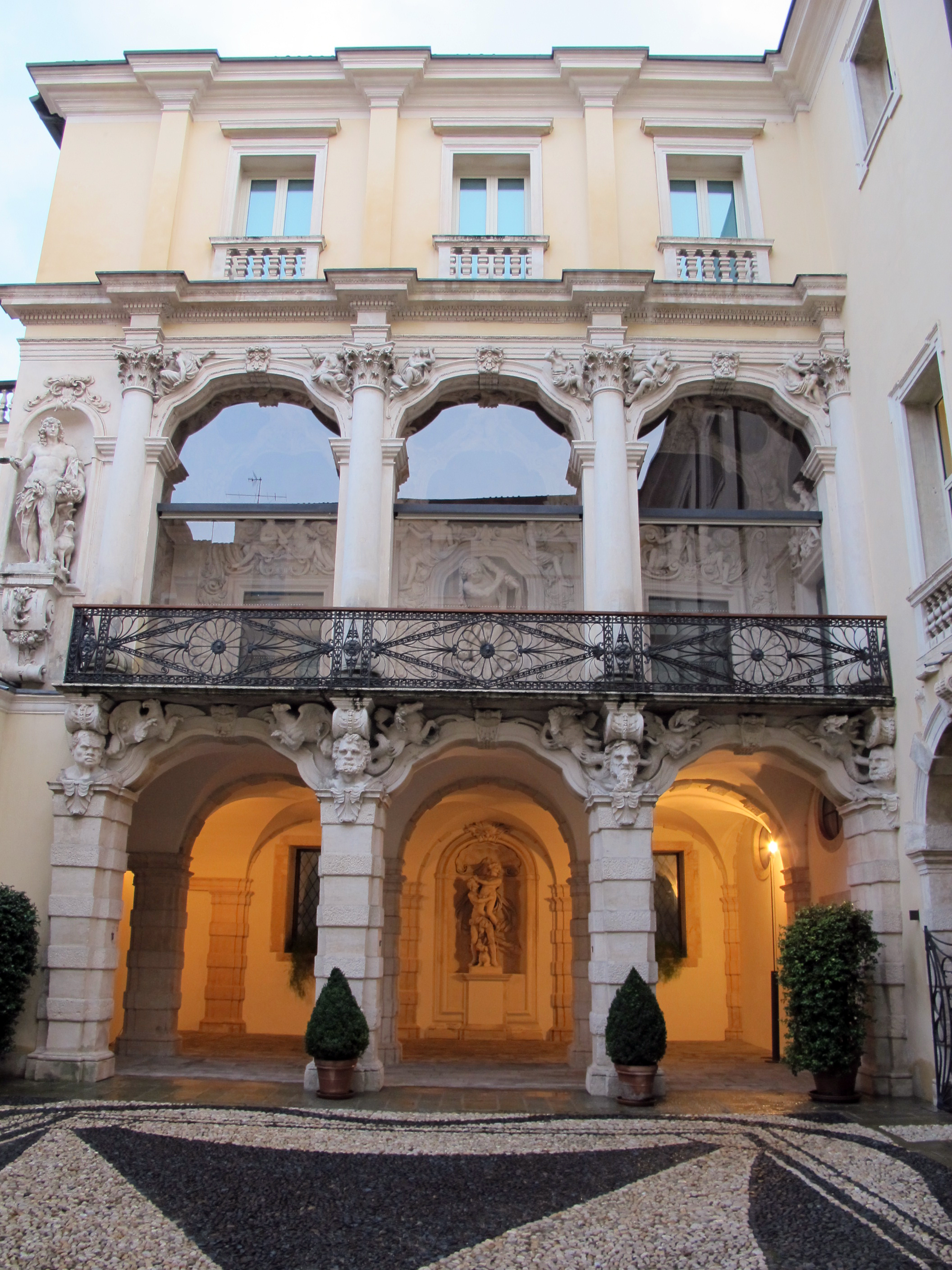
Inner courtyard of Palazzo Leoni Montanari

- Palazzo Lampertico, in Corso Palladio.

Birthplace of the statesman, designed in Vicentine neoclassical style by Giacomo Fontana in 1804 and completed around the mid-19th century by Giovanni Maria Negrin Quartesan (son of Antonio Caregaro Negrin).

- See also the adjacent Palazzetto Capra Lampertico.
- Palazzo Lanzè Sesso (or Sesso Zen Fontana), at Contrà Zanella. 45.549116°N 11.546105°E

Built in the 1440s in flamboyant Gothic style, unifying earlier buildings, including Lanzè tower houses.

- Palazzo Lanzi Bonaguro, in Piazza XX Settembre, corner of Contrà Santa Lucia (Borgo di San Pietro).

Designed by Francesco Antonio Ziggiotti in 1769, a monumental residence in Scamozzian style.

- Palazzo Lanzi Vecchia, between Motton San Lorenzo and Contrà Cantarane → Palazzo Vecchia Romanelli.
- Palazzo Leoni Montanari, at Contrà Santa Corona 25, corner of Contrà Apolloni. 45.550147°N 11.546952°E

A grand building, Vicenza's only Baroque palace, built in the 17th century by Bernardino Montanari and his heir Giovanni Leoni, unifying several pre-existing structures.

- Loggia Longhena, in Giardini Salvi. 45.54670°N 11.53808°E

Commissioned by Baldassare Longhena and built in Palladian style, it stands on the park's western side.

- Palazzo Lonigo, in Corso Palladio, corner of Contrà Manin.

Rebuilt after World War II, unifying several 16th–17th-century buildings.

- Palazzo Loschi Zileri Dal Verme, in Corso Palladio. 45.54657°N 11.54280°E

A neo-Palladian palace designed in 1780 by Ottone Calderari and built in the following decade, only the facade facing Corso Palladio was completed.

== M ==
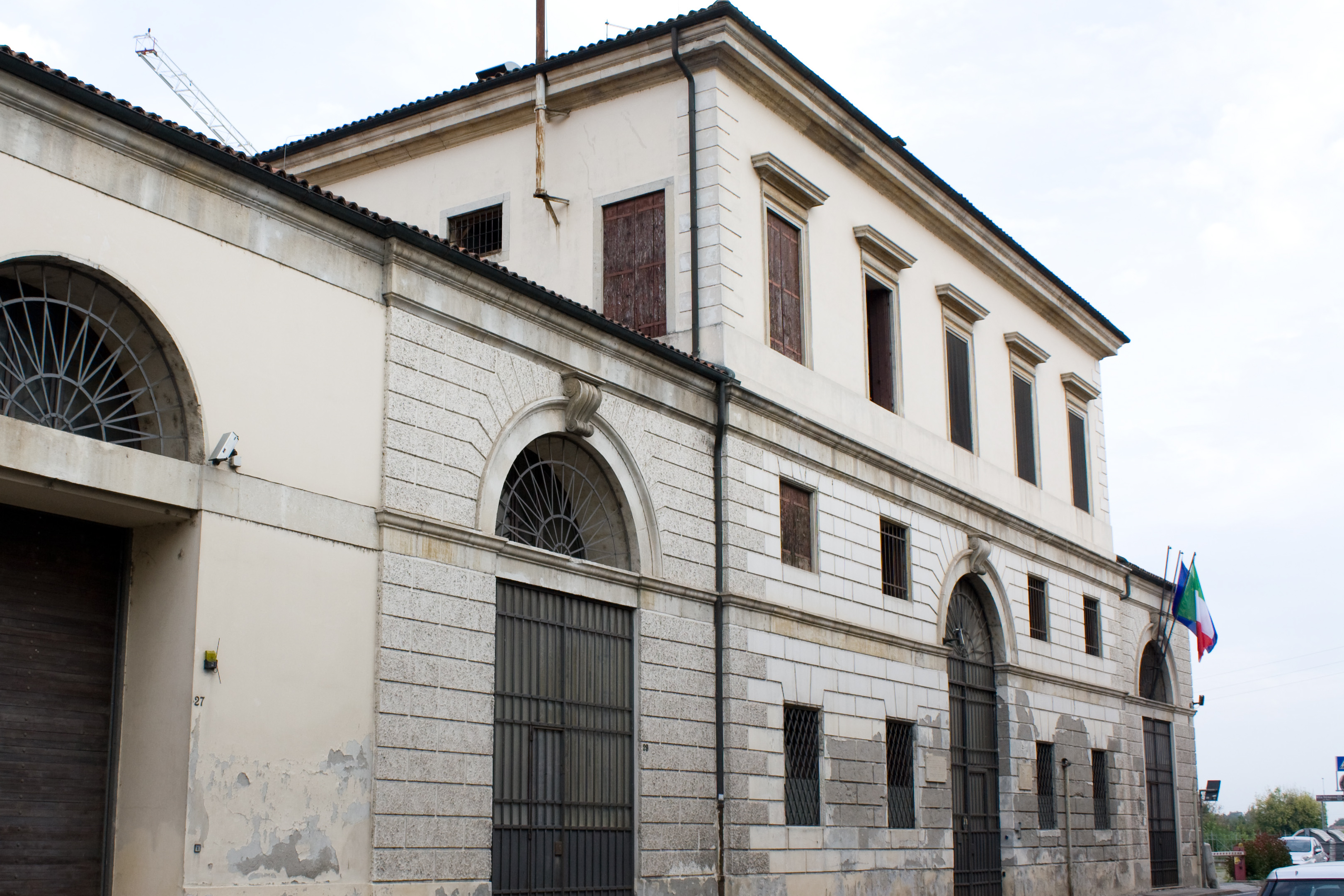
Salt warehouses

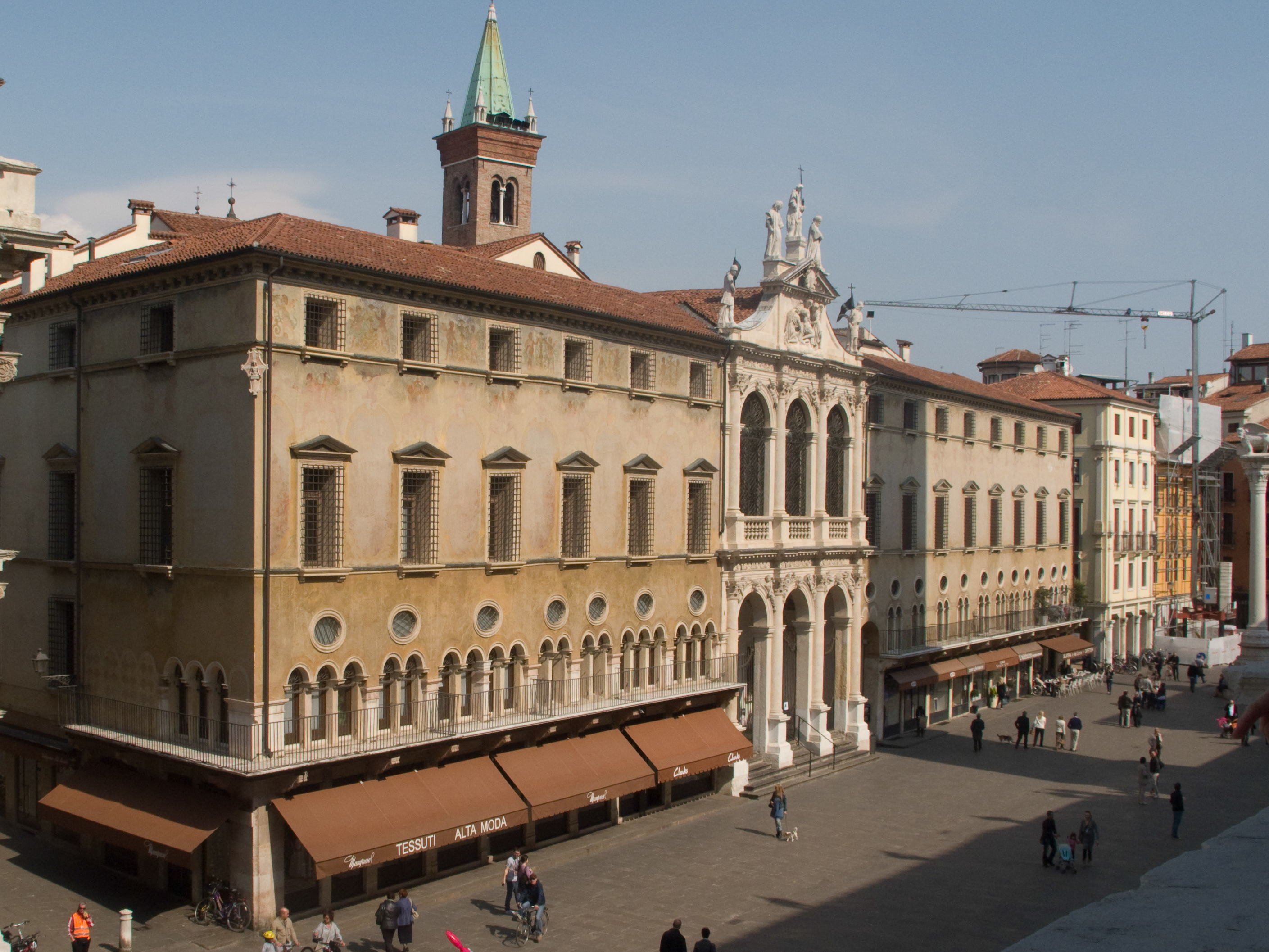
Palazzo del Monte di Pietà

- Magazzini del sale (Salt warehouses), at Borgo Berga.
- Palazzo Magrè Angaran → Palazzo Angaran.
- Teatro San Marco, at Contrà San Francesco 76 (continuation of Contrà San Marco). 45.55388°N 11.54381°E

Built in the 1920s near the Astichello River, it serves as the oratory of the San Marco parish and a cinema.

- Palazzetto Marzari, at Contrà San Gaetano.

A 16th-century building, remodelled in the 17th and 18th centuries.

- Palazzo Mattarello, at Contrà San Francesco Vecchio.

A 17th-century building, remodelled in the 18th century. Now a house of the clergy.

- Casa Milana Tacchi, at Contrà Santa Lucia (Borgo San Pietro).

Possibly by Ottavio Bertotti Scamozzi.

- Palazzo Molin Cordellina → Palazzetto Cordellina.
- Palazzo del Monte di Pietà, with its main facade on central Piazza dei Signori and sides on Contrà del Monte and Contrà Manin. 45.547514°N 11.546630°E

A monumental complex built between the 15th and 17th centuries, incorporating the Church of San Vincenzo in its central section.

- Casa Morselli, at Vicolo Cieco Retrone, corner of Contrà Piancoli.
- Palazzo Muttoni, at Contrà Santi Apostoli, corner of Contrà Lioy.

A reflection of Vicenza's late 16th-century architectural trends, possibly by Giandomenico Scamozzi.

- Palazzo Muttoni Franco → Palazzo Franco.
- Casa Muzan, at Contrà Do Rode.

Rebuilt by Antonio Caregaro Negrin in 1854.

- Palazzo Muzani, at Contrà Garibaldi, corner of Contrà Cesare Battisti.

A robust building from 1580.

- Palazzetto Muzzi, in Piazza Matteotti.

Commissioned in 1774 to Ottavio Bertotti Scamozzi, it was the residence of Vicentine poet Adolfo Giuriato.

== N ==
- Palazzo Nanti, in Piazzetta Santi Apostoli.

A typical example of local late Gothic with Venetian influences, from the late 15th century.

== O ==
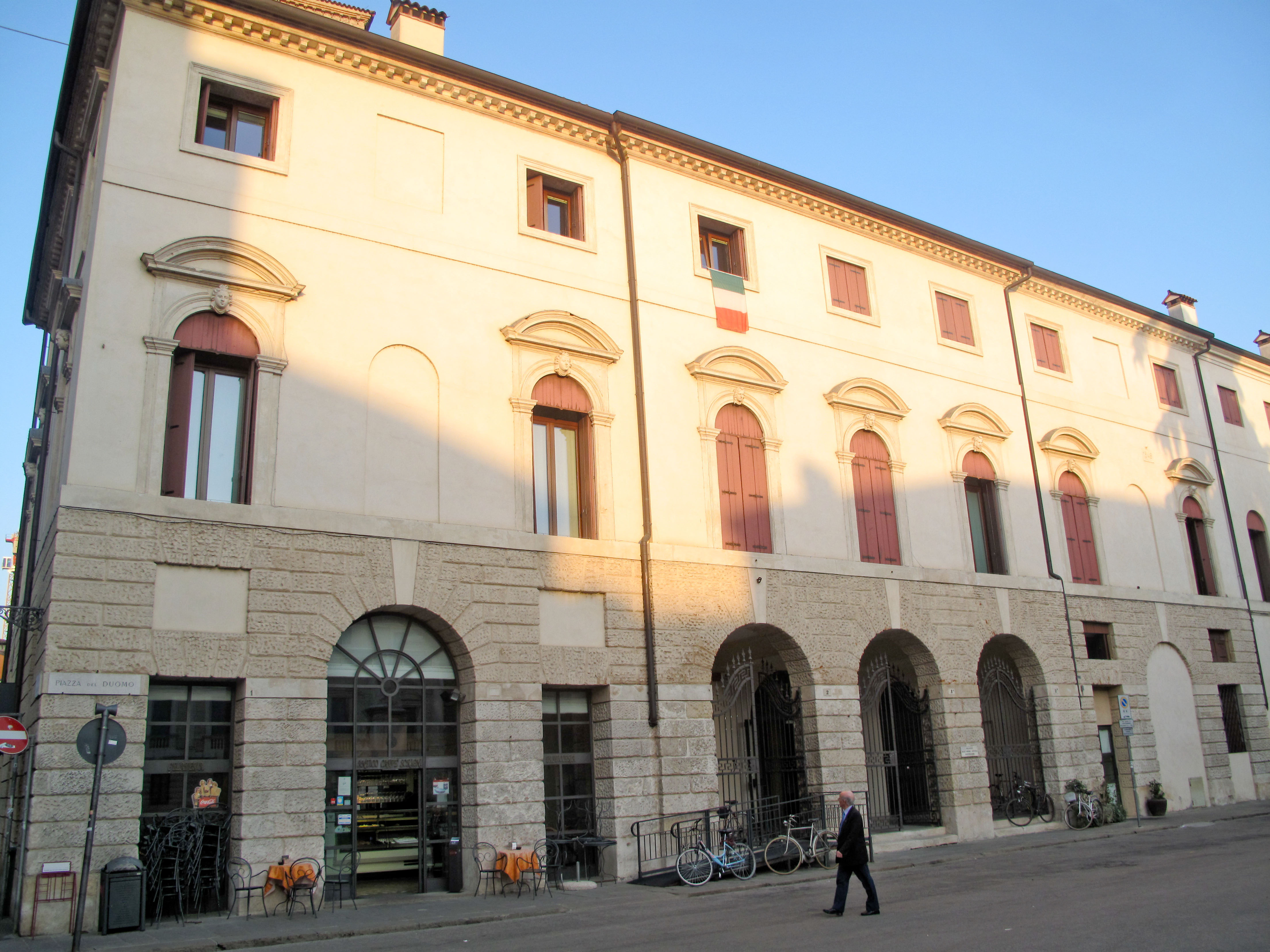
Palazzo delle Opere sociali

- Palazzo delle Opere sociali, at Piazza Duomo 2. 45.545936°N 11.544313°E

Built in the early 19th century for the Casino Nuovo on the site of dilapidated pre-existing buildings, including the hospital and church of Sant’Antonio Abate.

- Ostello Olimpico, at Viale Giuriolo 9, near Piazza Matteotti. 45.54843°N 11.55011°E

A Napoleonic-era palace, now the city's hostel.

== P ==
=== Pagello palaces ===
- Palazzo Pagello, at Contrà San Francesco 78. 45.55417°N 11.54275°E

Originally a late 16th-century building in typical Venetian style, it has been expanded and remodelled over time. Since the late 1920s, it has served as the rectory of the San Marco parish.

- Palazzetto Pagello, at Piazza Matteotti 18–20.

Built in the early 17th century, continuing 16th-century traditions.

- Palazzo Pagello in Corso Palladio → Palazzo Braghetta Pagello.

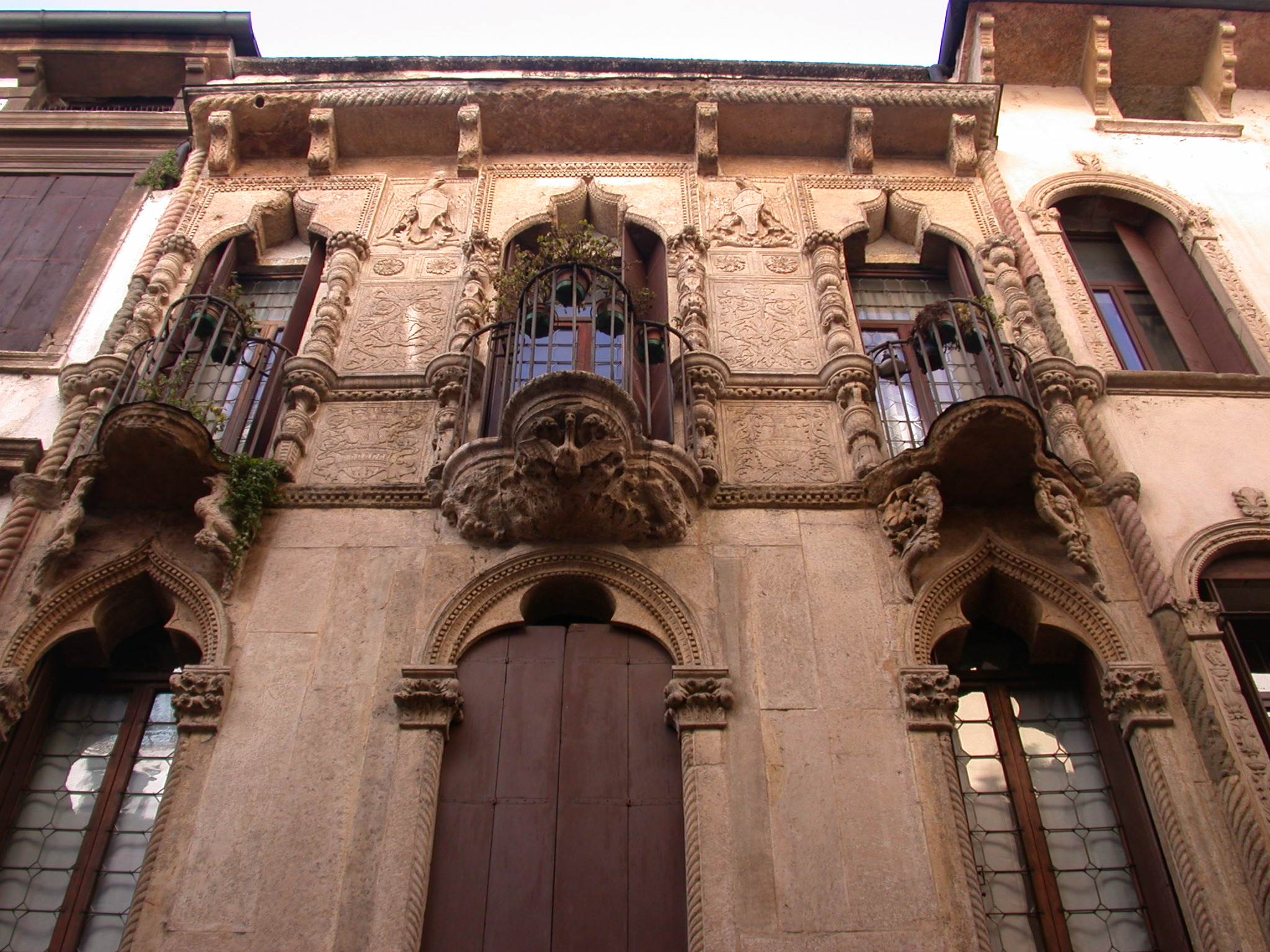
Casa Pigafetta

- Palazzo Pasini Canera di Salasco, at Contrà Carpagnon, corner of Contrà Oratorio dei Proti.

Retains its 16th-century appearance.

- Casa Pigafetta, at Contrà Pigafetta. 45.546210°N 11.546660°E

Remodelled by Matteo Pigafetta in 1481, a rare example of flamboyant Gothic.

- Palazzo Pigafetta, at Contrà Santi Apostoli.
- Palazzo Pigafetta Breganze, at Contrà Porton del Luzo. 45.543888°N 11.547949°E

A 17th-century building in Scamozzian tradition, built above the cavea of the Teatro Berga.

- Palazzo Pigatti, in Corso Fogazzaro.

A 1861 building designed by Marco Bonelli, a renovation of earlier structures.

- Casa Pigatti, at Contrà delle Grazie.

Its facade was designed by Enea Arnaldi on a pre-existing building of the Knights Hospitaller convent.

=== Piovene palaces ===
- Palazzo Piovene sul Corso → Palazzo da Porto Piovene.
- Palazzo Piovene Orgian, at Contrà Riale, corner of Stradella San Giacomo.

Austere late 17th- to early 18th-century building by Vicentine architect Giuseppe Marchi.

- Palazzo Piovene, at Contrà San Faustino 17.

Built in 1823 based on a design by Carlo Greco.

- Palazzo Piovene at Contrà San Marco 41 → Palazzo Barbieri Vajenti Piovene Cicogna.
- Palazzetto Piovene at Contrà Porti 24 → Palazzetto Franceschini Piovene.
- Palazzo Piovene at Contrà Zanella → Palazzo Sesso Piovene.
- Palazzo Piovene all’Isola, on the Retrone, built in 1569 as part of a comprehensive redevelopment of the Isola's commercial area, demolished in 1818.
- Palazzo Piovene, demolished, on the site now occupied by Palazzo Repeta, in Piazza San Lorenzo.

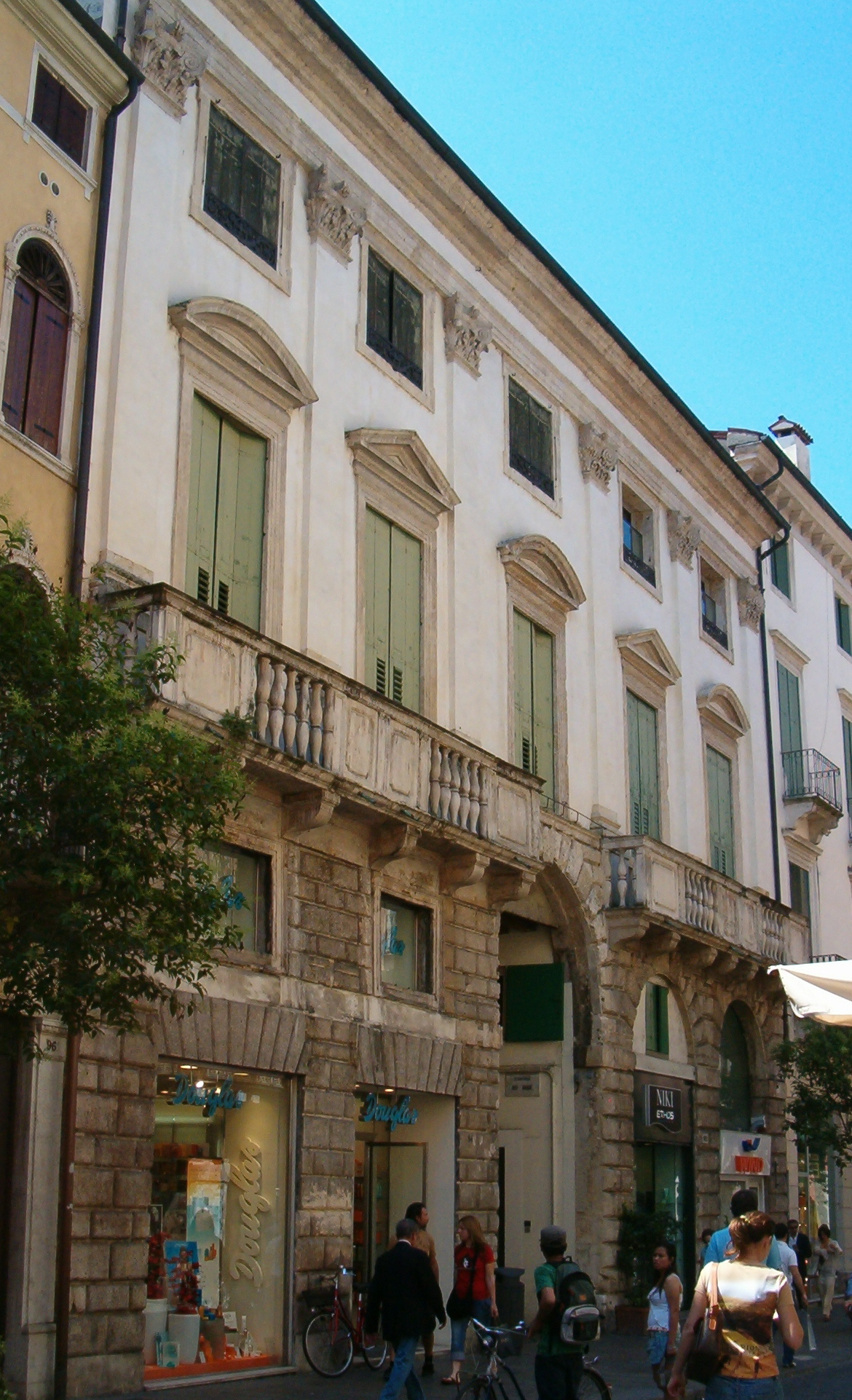
Palazzo Pojana

- Palazzo Piovini Beltrame, in Piazza Castello. 45.54611°N 11.54171°E

Austere mid-17th-century palace attributed to Antonio Pizzocaro. It incorporates the earlier Palazzetto Capra sul Corso on its left flank.

- Case Pizzioni, at Stradella delle Barche.

By Giandomenico Scamozzi.

- Palazzo del Podestà, in Piazza Biade. 45.547076°N 11.546974°E

An ancient palace of the Bissari family, acquired by the municipality in the 13th century, repeatedly renovated, destroyed by World War II bombings, and subsequently rebuilt, now housing municipal offices.

- Palazzo Pojana, at Contrà San Tommaso, a 16th-century work attributed to Palladio, renovated in the 18th century by Francesco Muttoni.
- Palazzo Pojana, at Corso Palladio 90–94. 45.54760°N 11.54496°E

Attributed to architect Andrea Palladio, designed around 1540. It is included in Vicenza's 23 Palladian monuments listed as a UNESCO World Heritage Site. Contrà Do Rode begins under the palace's arch.

=== Porto palaces and houses ===
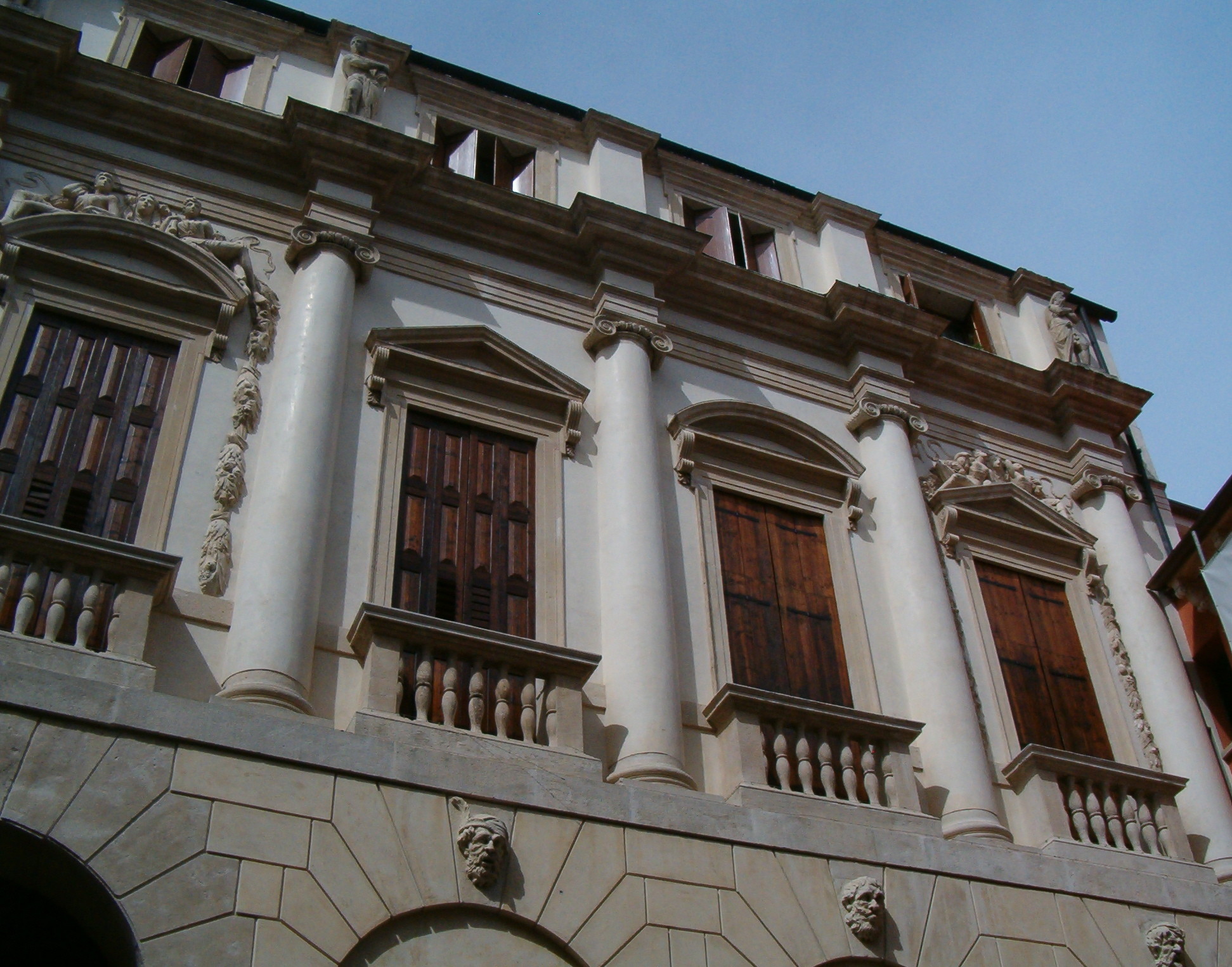
Palazzo Porto Festa

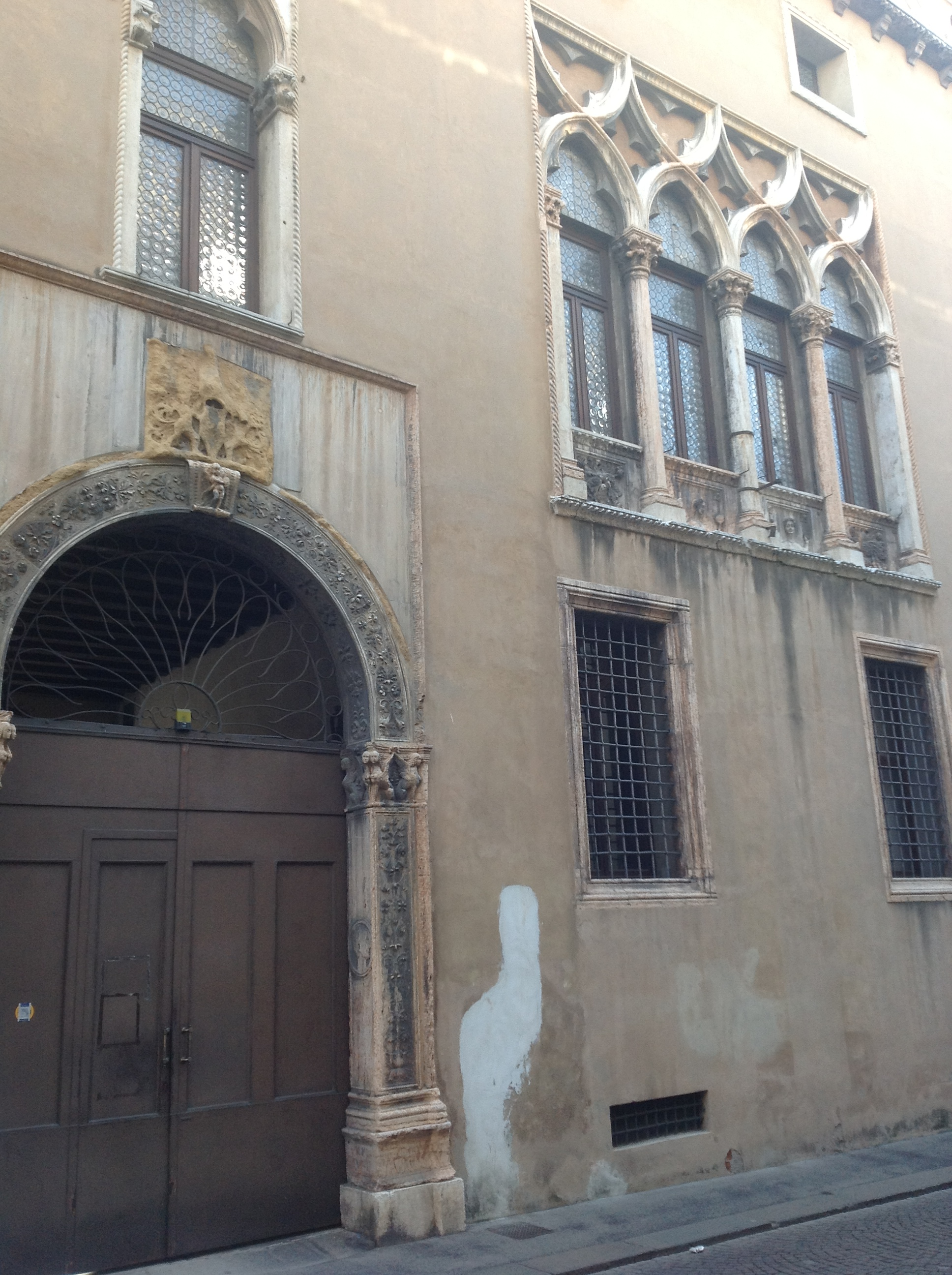
Palazzo da Porto Breganze

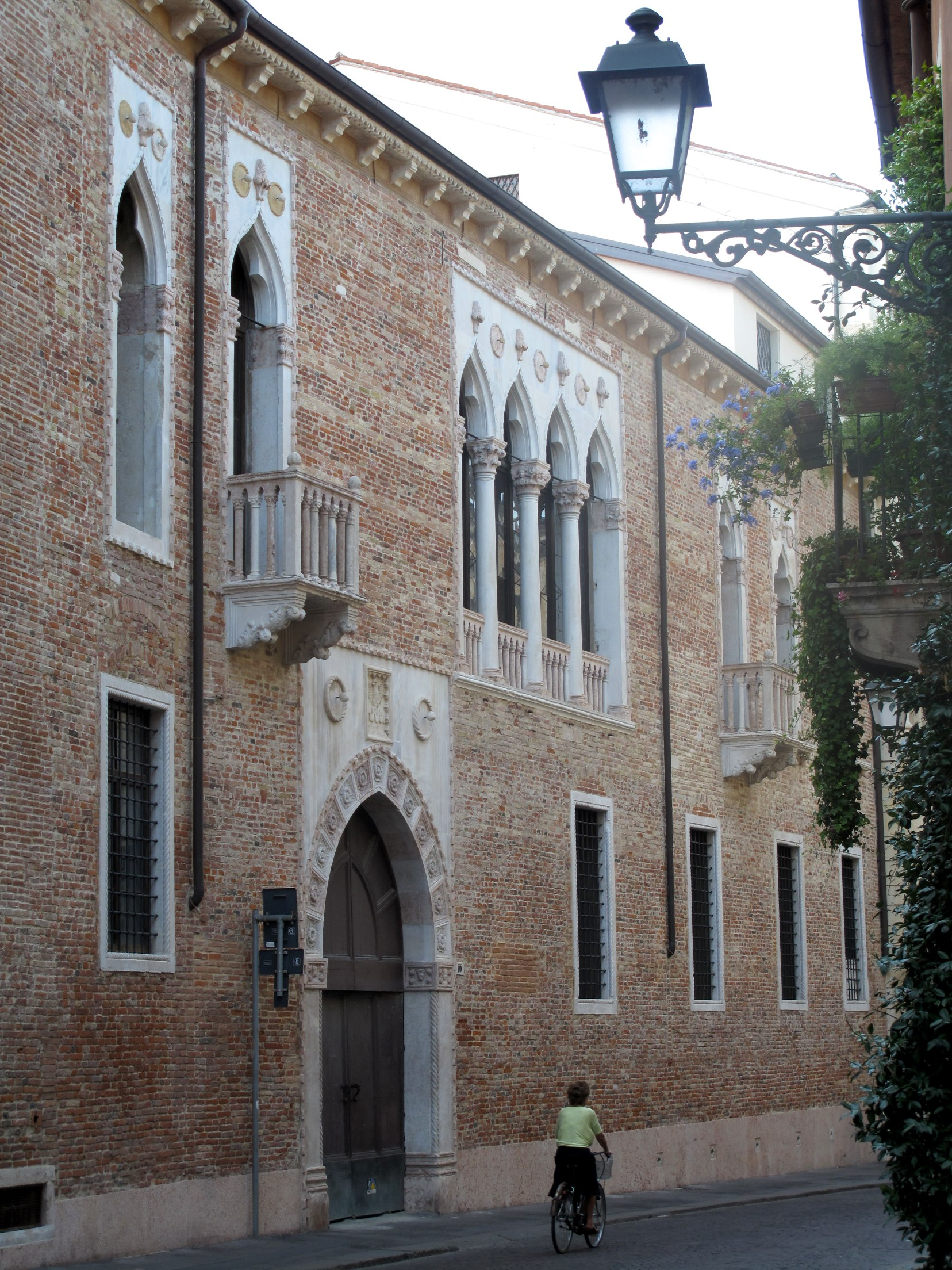
Palazzo da Porto Colleoni

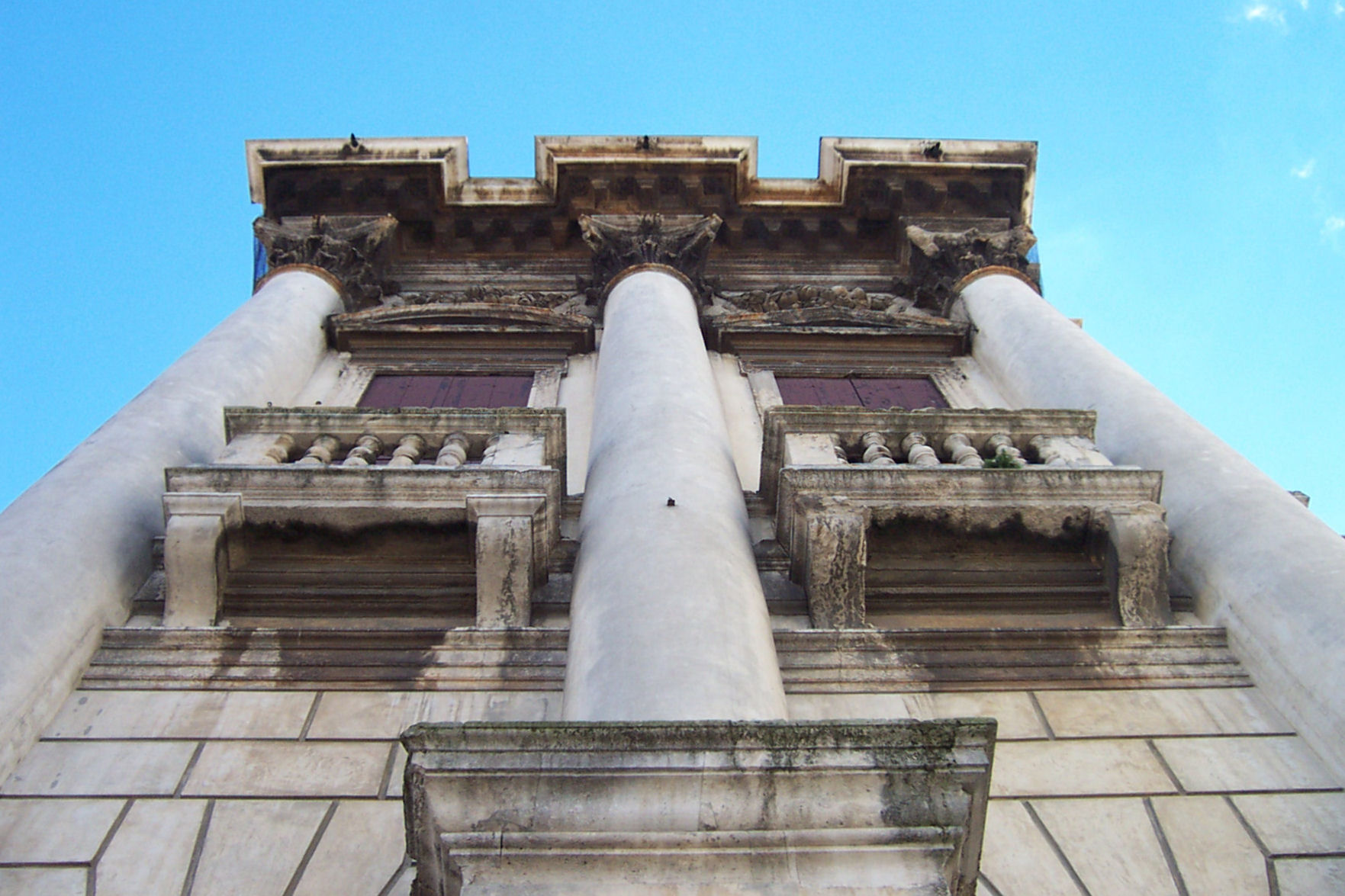
Palazzo Porto in Piazza Castello

The Porto were one of the leading families dominating the Vicentine Committee since the early 10th century, serving as highly influential vicecomites under the bishop and being part of Vicenza's Noble Council.

- Palazzo Porto Festa, at Contrà Porti 21. 45.549618°N 11.545313°E

Designed by Andrea Palladio, commissioned by nobleman Iseppo da Porto in 1552; the building underwent a prolonged design phase and an even lengthier, troubled construction, remaining partially incomplete. It is a UNESCO World Heritage Site since 1994.

- Palazzo Porto, at Contrà Porti 16.

A late 15th-century building, rebuilt after World War II.

- Palazzetto da Porto Muzan, at Contrà Porti 23.

A late Gothic building.

- Palazzo da Porto Breganze, at Contrà Porti 17.

The city's most lavish building in flamboyant Gothic style.

- Palazzo da Porto Colleoni, at Contrà Porti 19.

One of Vicenza's finest examples of flamboyant Gothic style.

- Palazzo Barbaran da Porto, at Contrà Porti 11. 45.54861°N 11.54555°E

A Renaissance building by Andrea Palladio, now home to the Palladio Museum.

- Case da Porto, at Contrà Porti 13 and 15.

17th-century buildings.

- Palazzo da Porto Negri De Salvi, in Piazzetta Santo Stefano.

A Gothic building renovated in Renaissance style.

- Palazzo da Porto Piovene, in Corso Palladio.

Built in the late 16th century; birthplace of Guido Piovene.

- Palazzo Porto in Piazza Castello or Palazzo da Porto Breganze, in Piazza Castello. 45.545250°N 11.540925°E

A noble palace designed around 1571 for Alessandro Porto, attributed to Andrea Palladio and left incomplete.

- Palazzetto da Porto Sesso, adjacent to Palazzo Porto in Piazza Castello.

A Renaissance work from the early 16th century.

- Palazzo delle Poste, at Contrà Garibaldi. 45.546255°N 11.544868°E

Designed by Roberto Narducci, built between 1932 and 1936.

- Palazzetto Povegliani, at Contrà Zanella.

A late 15th-century building.

- Antico Palazzo Prefettizio, at Contrà Del Monte.
- Palazzo della Prefettura → Palazzo Volpe Maltauro.
- Ospizio e Oratorio dei Proti, at the corner of Contrà Giampietro de Proti and Contrà Oratorio dei Proti.

Built in the 15th century and completely renovated by Antonio Pizzocaro in the late 17th century.

== Q ==
- Palazzo Querini → Palazzo Capra Querini Rezzara.
- Palazzo Quinto at Viale Eretenio.

Designed by Ottone Calderari, but never built, on the site later occupied by the Teatro Eretenio.

== R ==
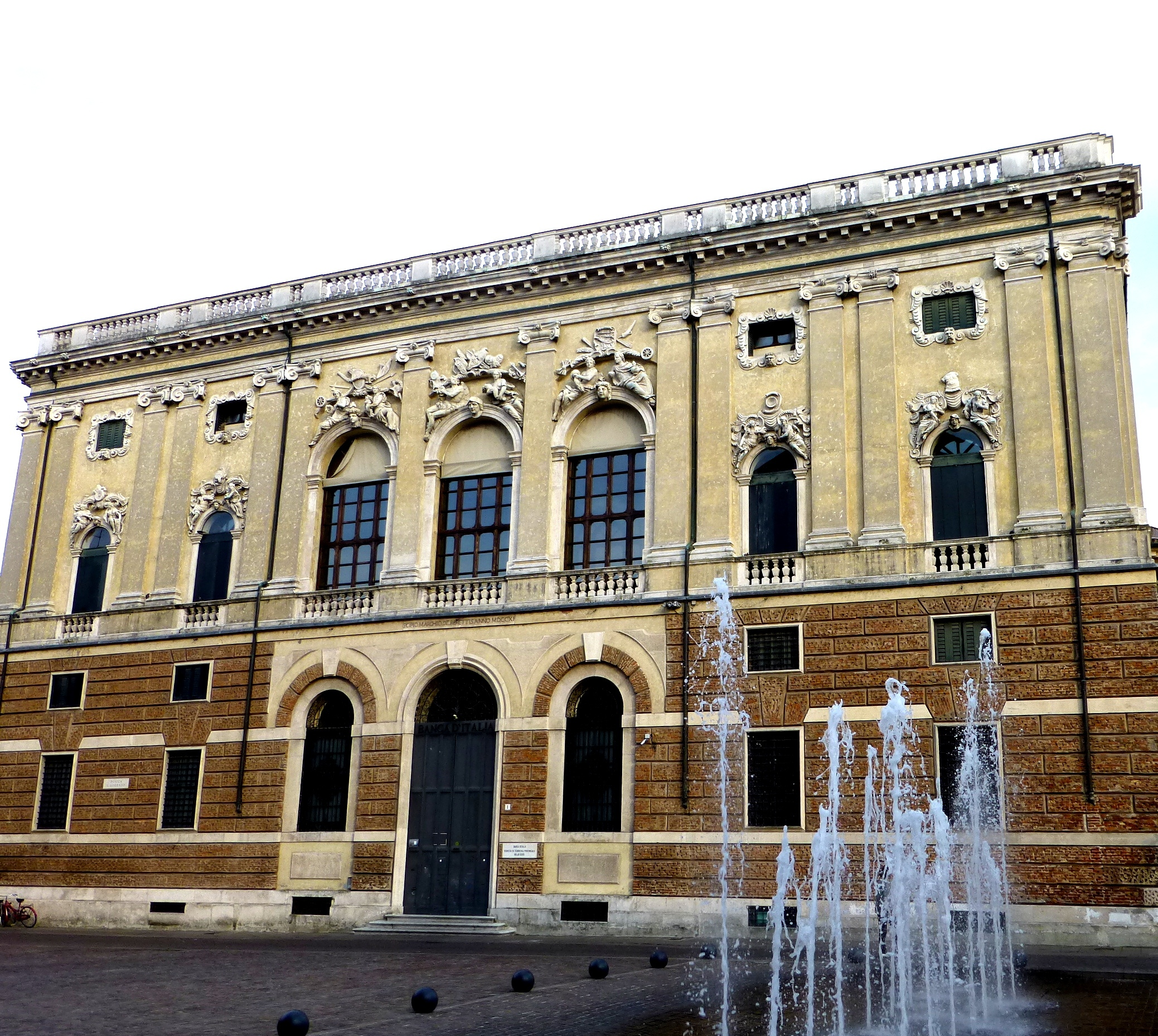
Palazzo Repeta

- Palazzo della Ragione → Basilica Palladiana.
- Palazzo Regaù, at Contrà XX Settembre 37–39 (Borgo San Pietro). 45.550194°N 11.552483°E

A late Gothic palace from the mid-15th century.

- Palazzo Repeta, in Piazza San Lorenzo. 45.548372°N 11.542336°E

Opposite the Church of San Lorenzo, this massive palace was built by Francesco Muttoni between 1701 and 1711, one of his earliest works. It served as the local headquarters of the Bank of Italy.

- Palazzo Roi, at Contrà San Marco 37 (Borgo Pusterla). 45.551609°N 11.543642°E

An 1891 building in eclectic neo-Gothic style with Lombard influences.

- Palazzo Roma, at Piazza Duomo 5. 45.545692°N 11.544219°E

Built in 1599 and rebuilt after World War II.

== S ==
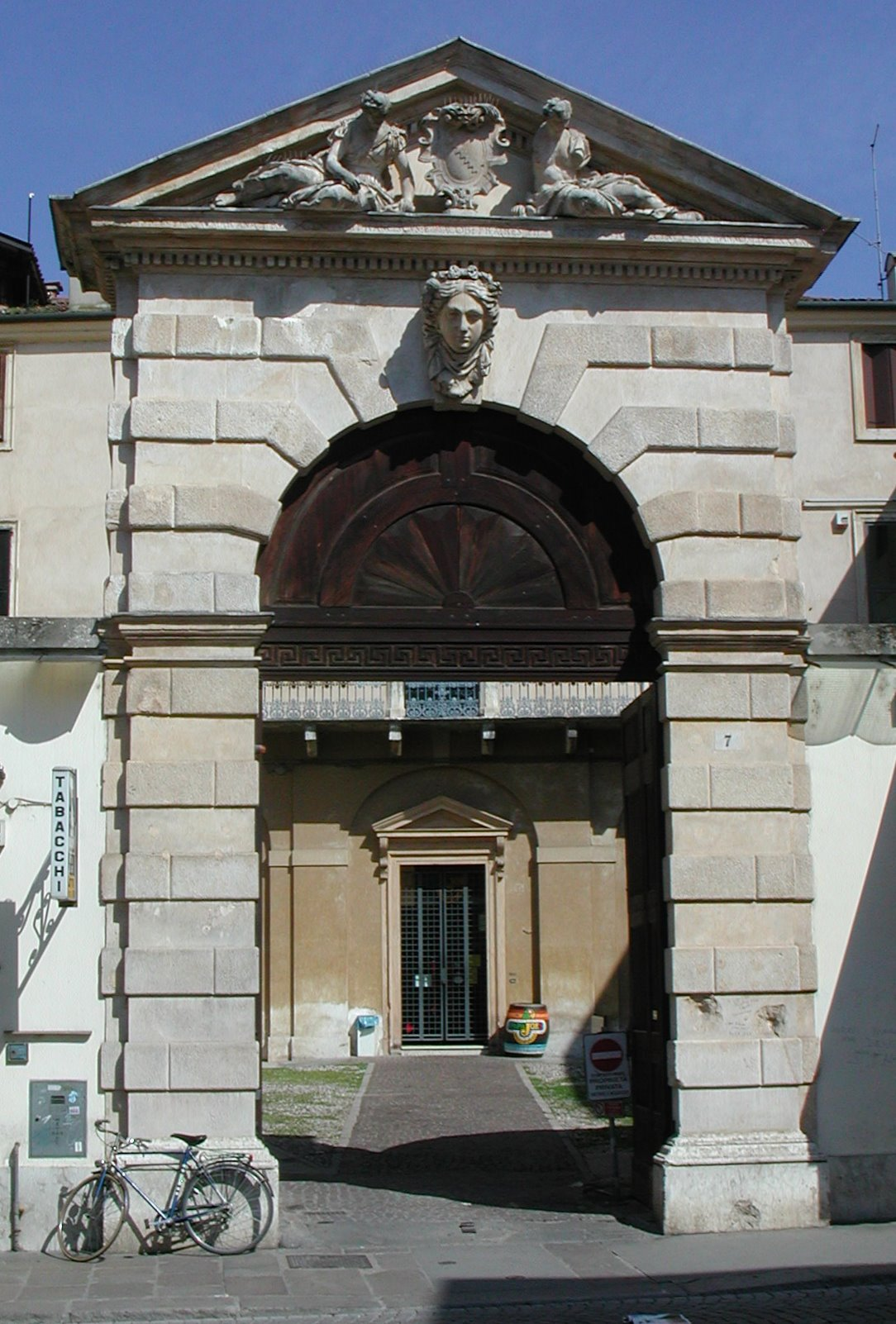
Palazzo Salvi on Corso Palladio, entrance

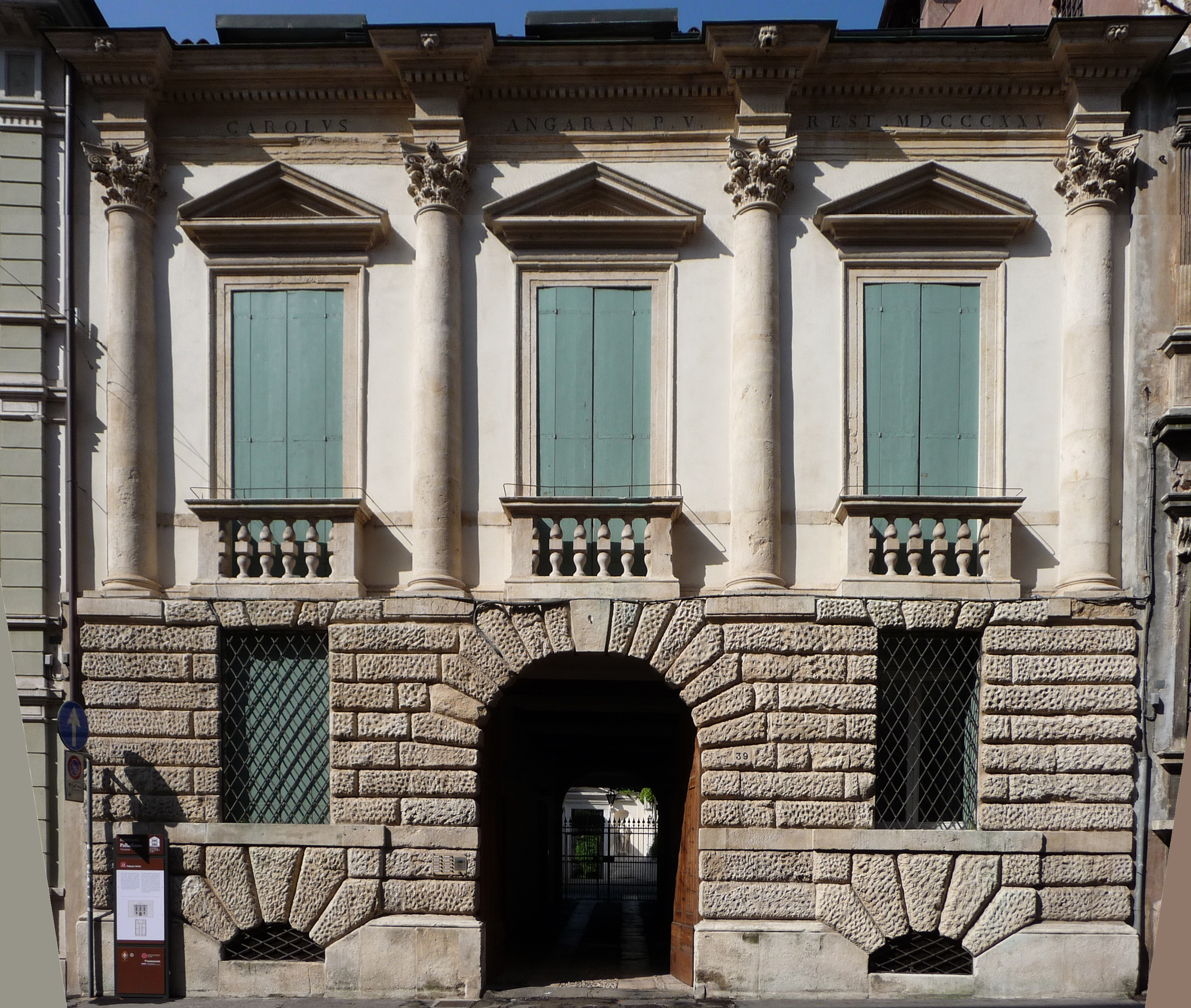
Palazzo Schio

- Palazzo Sale Capra, in Piazzetta Santo Stefano

Designed by Francesco Muttoni, but instead, a plain, uniform facade was constructed in the mid-18th century.

- Palazzo Sale di San Damiano, in Contrà del Pozzetto 10

Likely an early 16th-century building.

- Palazzo Sale Serbelloni, in Contrà Oratorio dei Proti

A massive rectangular building with a facade renovated in the early 18th century, transferred to the hospital in 1841 and later to the IPAB.

- Palazzo Salvi, in Corso Palladio

An incomplete palace designed in 1784 by Ottone Calderari.

- Palazzo Salvi, in Contrà Santa Corona

Constructed in the late 18th century and remodeled in the mid-19th century by Giovanni Maria Negrin Quartesan.

- Palazzo Sangiovanni, in Contrà Santi Apostoli 21 45.544952°N 11.547058°E

A late Gothic building, now housing ULSS services.

- Palazzo Schio Vaccari Lioy Angaran, in Contrà San Marco 39 45.55169°N 11.54352°E

Renovated for Bernardo Schio by Andrea Palladio, who designed its facade in 1560, it was completed around 1574–1575. It was restored by Carlo Angaran in 1825.

- Palazzo Schio in Corso Palladio → Palazzo Caldogno Dal Toso Franceschini da Schio, known as Ca' d'Oro
- Palazzo Scola, in Piazza Castello

A notable late 17th- to early 18th-century building.

- Palazzo Scroffa, in Contrà Borgo Scroffa

A 16th-century palace with adjacent rustic structures by Bartolomeo Malacarne, demolished in the 1960s.

- Palazzetto Scroffa, in Contrà Piancoli 6 45.54657°N 11.54828°E

A fine Gothic building.

- Episcopal Seminary, in Contrà Santa Lucia 43 (Borgo Santa Lucia) 45.55463°N 11.55289°E

Built in 1842 based on a design by the Venetian Francesco Lazzari.

=== Sesso palaces ===
- Palazzetto Sesso in Piazza Castello, adjacent to Palazzo Porto → Palazzetto da Porto Sesso
- Palazzo Sesso in Contrà Zanella → Palazzo Lanzè Sesso
- Palazzo Sesso Piovene, in Contrà Zanella

The exterior reflects the transitional period of the late 15th century.

- Palazzo Squarzi, in Contrà Santi Apostoli 45.545143°N 11.545026°E

Parts of the original Gothic facade remain.

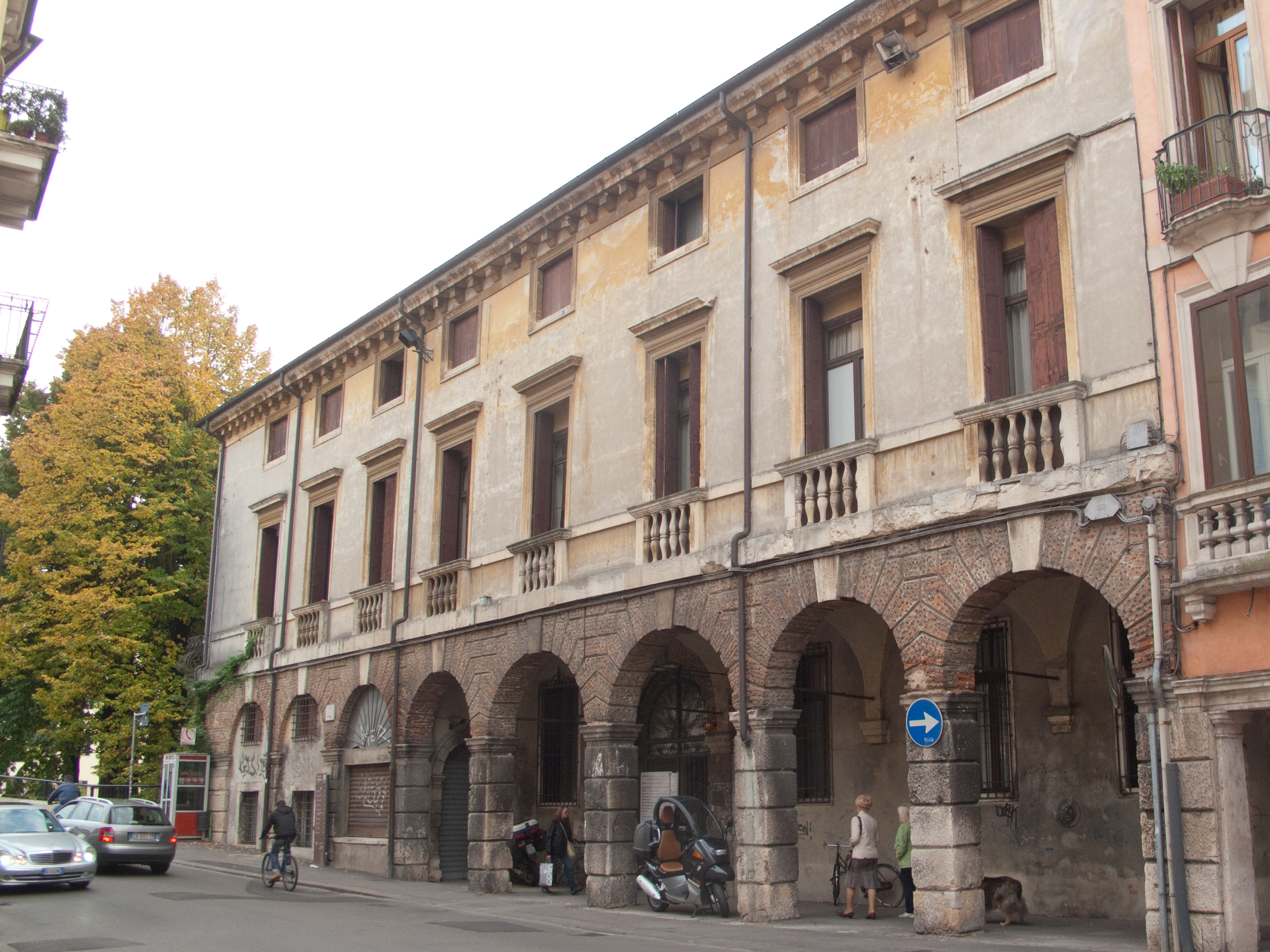
Palazzo Stecchini Nussi

- Palazzo Stecchini Nussi, in Contrà San Marco 3 45.55101°N 11.54405°E

Constructed between 1620 and 1630, attributed to Ottavio Bruto Revese, it later became property of the Diocese of Vicenza, which converted it into a student dormitory. It features a distinctive island-shaped garden within a bend of the Bacchiglione River.

== T ==
- Small temple in Querini Park, in the park of the same name, Viale Rumor 45.55392°N 11.54808°E

A monopteros temple at the center of an artificial island, built in classical style by Antonio Piovene in 1820, with Ionic columns supporting the dome. Beneath it lies an ancient icehouse.

- Palazzo del Territorio, in Piazza Matteotti 45.54996°N 11.54960°E

A complex of buildings, remodeled in the 16th and 17th centuries, located on the site of the 13th-century San Pietro Castle. It houses the Teatro Olimpico.

- Palazzo Terzi, in Corso Fogazzaro

Built in the second half of the 17th century on a pre-existing 15th-century structure, of which the portal remains.

=== Thiene palaces ===
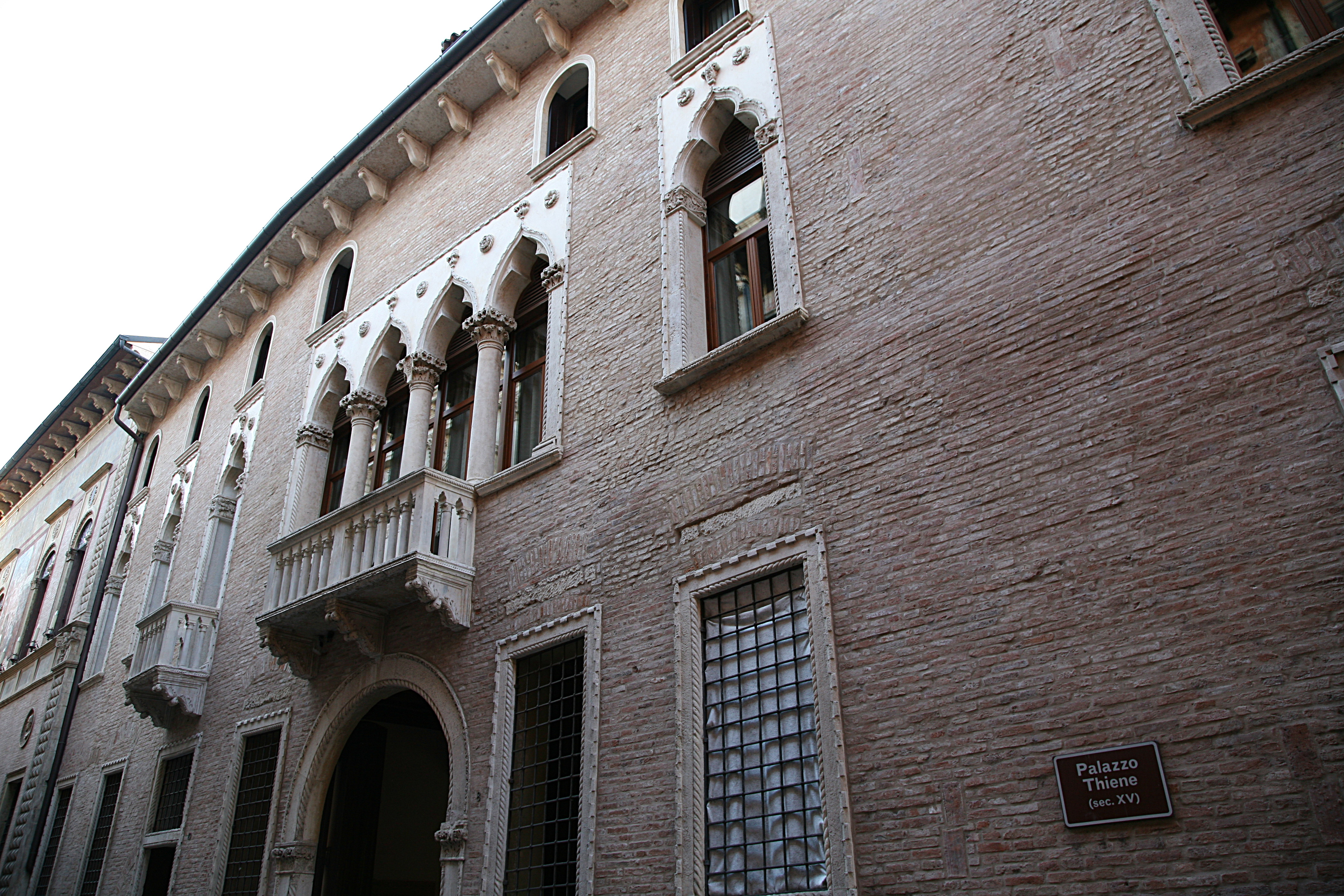
Palazzo Thiene

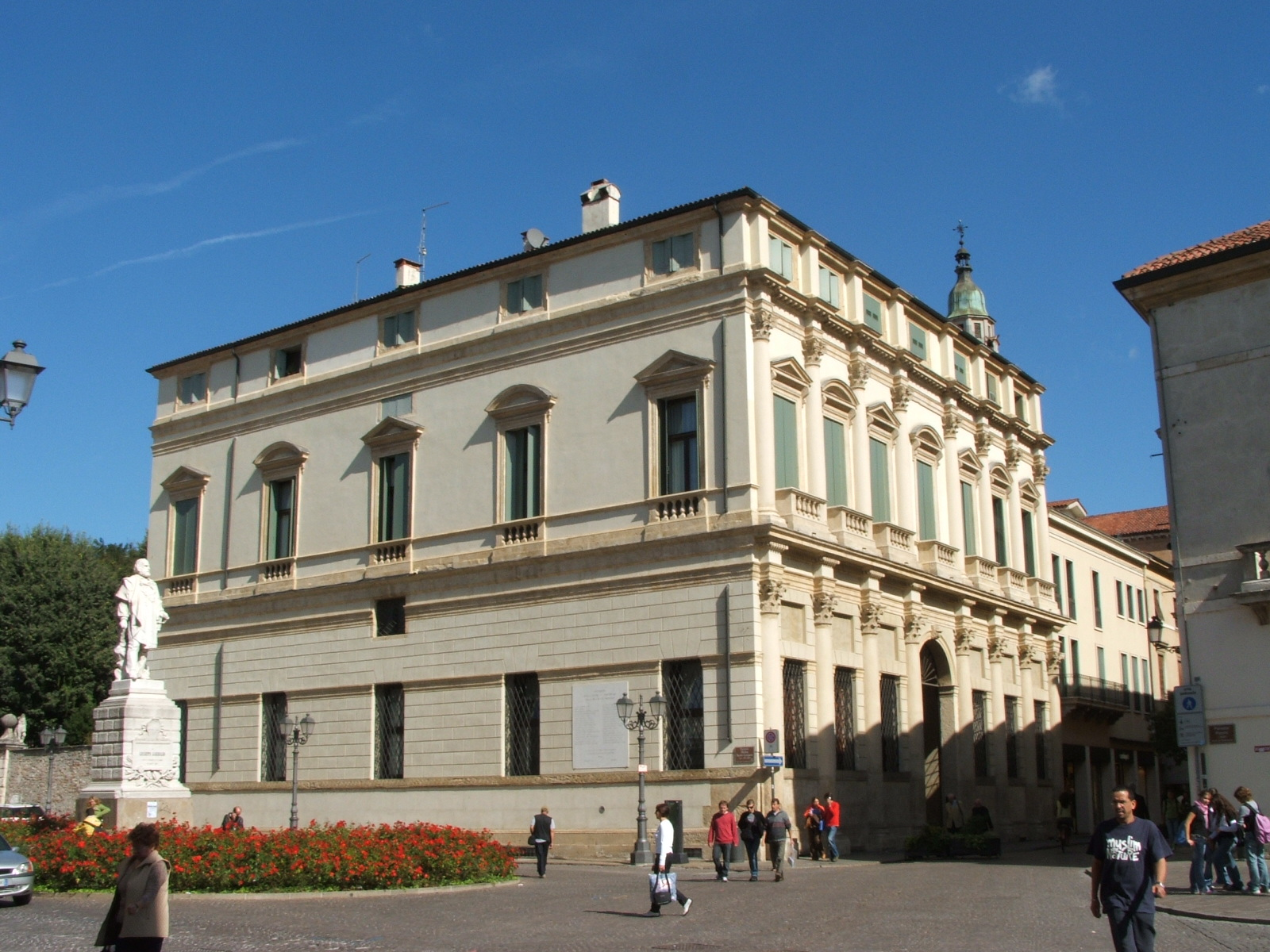
Palazzo Thiene Bonin Longare

The Thiene are an ancient family that, while maintaining the city of Thiene as their primary area of interest, relocated to Vicenza in the early 14th century. They expanded their holdings across various parts of the province, reaching as far as Camisano Vicentino. The Thiene were granted the title of palatine counts by Emperor Frederick III in 1469.

Andrea Palladio conceived—and documented in his Four Books of Architecture—a unified project for the Thiene palace, intended to cover the entire area between Corso Palladio, Contrà Porti, Stradella della Banca Popolare, and Contrà San Gaetano Thiene. The project could not be fully realized, resulting in three distinct palaces within this block today:

- Palazzo Thiene, at No. 8 Contrà Porti

A late expression (1450–1460) of local Gothic with Venetian influences.

- Palazzo Thiene (of Ludovico Thiene), at No. 12 Contrà Porti 45.548555°N 11.546072°E

Built in the late 15th century by Lorenzo da Bologna and Tommaso da Lugano, who crafted the fine portal in red Verona marble, it underwent various interventions in the 16th century and was restored in 1872–73 after being acquired by the Banca Popolare.

- Palazzo Thiene (of Marcantonio and Adriano Thiene), in Contrà San Gaetano Thiene 45.548555°N 11.546072°E

Construction began in 1542 based on Palladio's design, intended to connect to the 15th-century palaces in Contrà Porti, but only the eastern section was completed. The palace has been included in the UNESCO World Heritage List since 1994. Historically the headquarters of the Banca Popolare di Vicenza, it is also used for exhibitions and cultural activities.

Other palaces of the Thiene family include:

- Palazzo Thiene Bonin Longare, in Corso Palladio 13, corner of Piazza Castello 45.546389°N 11.541572°E

Designed by Andrea Palladio and built by Vincenzo Scamozzi after the master's death, it is now the headquarters of the Vicenza Industrial Association.

- Palazzo Thiene sul Corso, in Corso Palladio

The ground floor and first floor are in mid-15th-century late Gothic style, while the second floor and attic were added in the mid-18th century.

- Case Thiene, in Contrà Porta Santa Lucia (Borgo di San Pietro)

Featuring a fine courtyard portal from the early 1440s, possibly an eclectic work by Palladio.

- Palazzo Thiene di Ercole, in Corso Palladio, demolished after the 1944 bombing
- Case Tornieri, in Corso Palladio 103–109
- Casa Tosin, in Contrà Santa Lucia (Borgo di San Pietro)
- Palazzo Traverso, in Contrà Cabianca 2

A building renovated after the mid-16th century on a pre-existing structure.

=== Trento palaces ===
- Palazzetto Trento, in Contrà San Faustino 18

A fine example of Vicentine architecture from the second half of the 17th century, attributed to Antonio Pizzocaro.

- Palazzo Trento Valmarana, in Contrà Cabianca, rear on Contrà San Faustino

An 18th-century palace designed by Francesco Muttoni.

- Palazzo Trissino Trento, in Via Cesare Battisti → Palazzo Trissino al Duomo
- Palazzo Trevisan Lampertico, in Contrà Riale

Attributed to Giuseppe Marchi.

=== Trissino palaces and houses ===
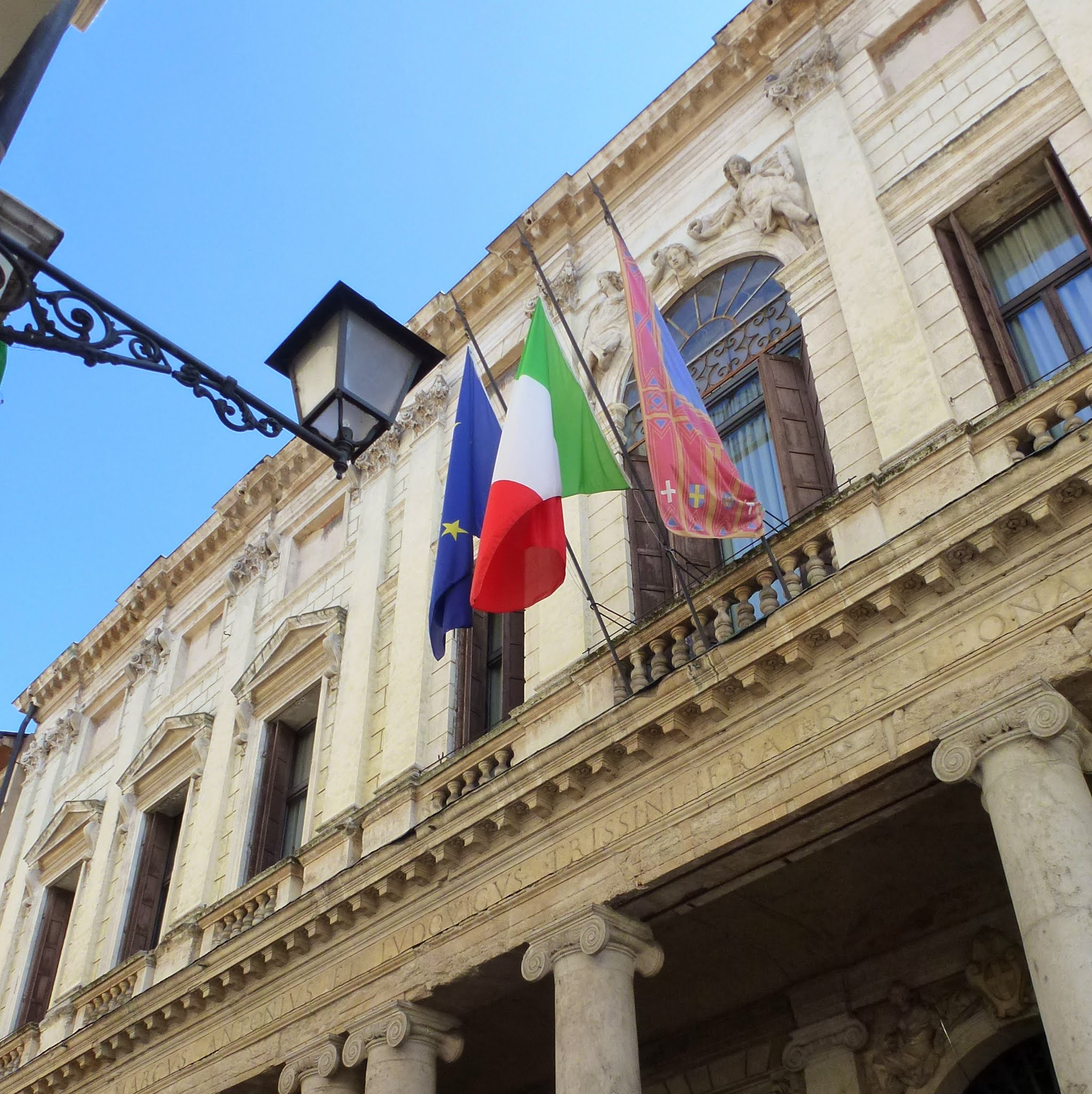
Palazzo Trissino Baston al Corso (Vicenza Town Hall)

The Trissino were one of the most prominent families in Vicenza during the Renaissance. An ancient noble family of Germanic origin in the Vicentine region, they received feudal investitures from both the Empire and the Church. Their domains extended from the town of Trissino, where a castle stood, to other nearby villages, so much so that the Valle dell’Agno was known for centuries as the Valle di Trissino.

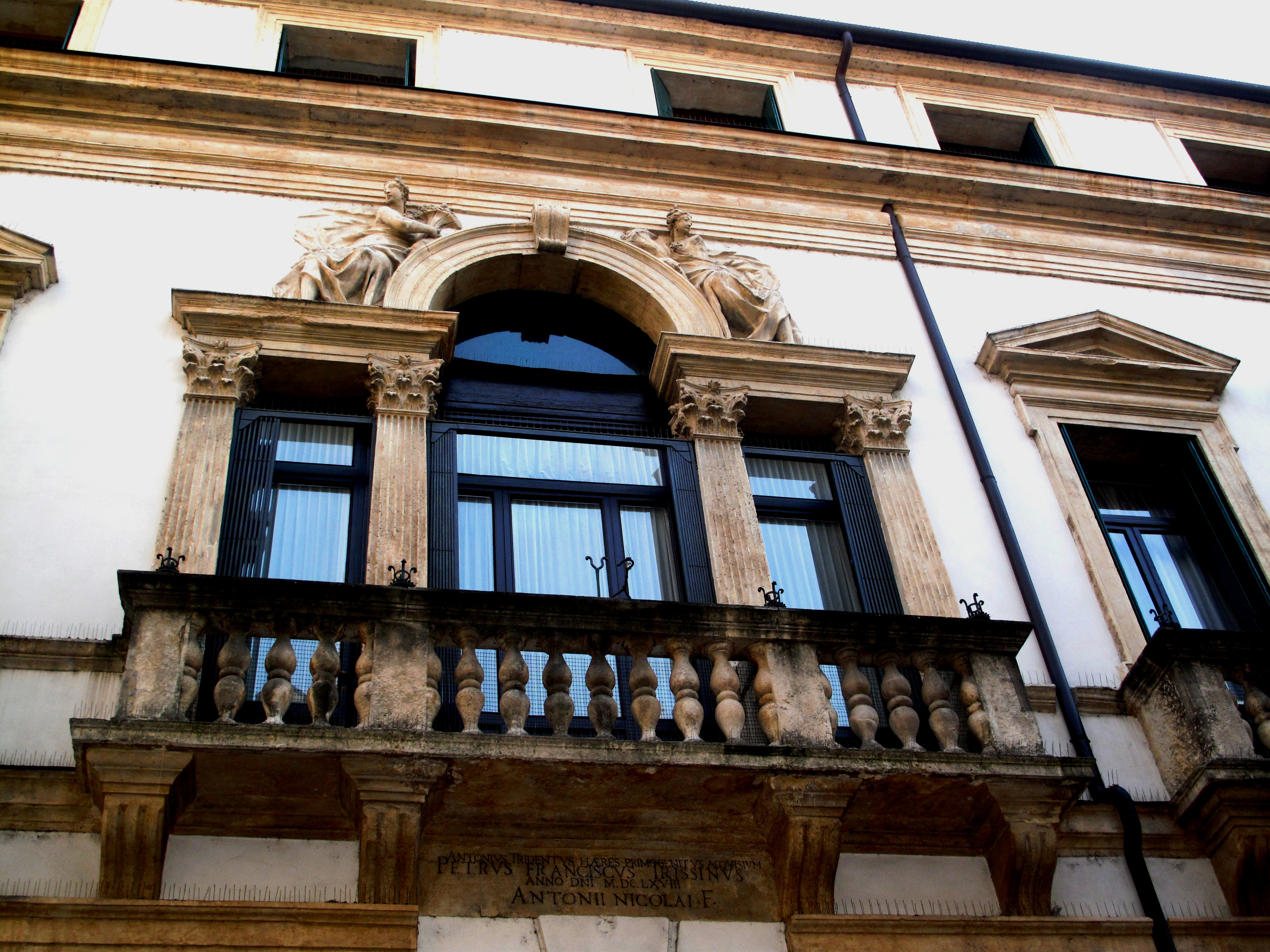
Palazzo Trissino al Duomo

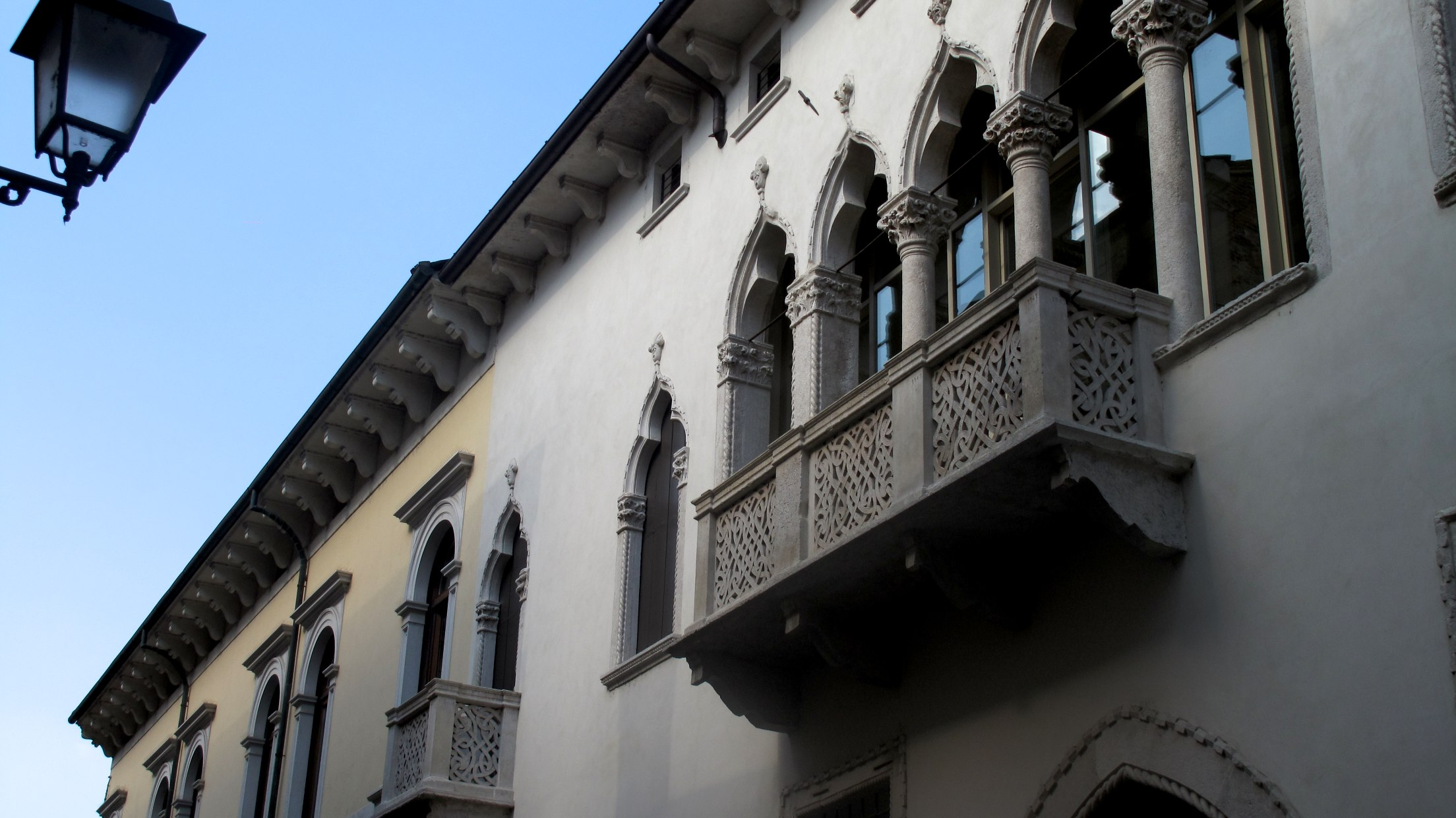
Palazzo Trissino Clementi (or Trissino Sperotti)

- Palazzo Trissino Baston al Corso, in Corso Palladio 98, corner of Contrà Cavour 45.547767°N 11.545394°E

Designed by the architect Vincenzo Scamozzi, it has been the main seat of the Municipality of Vicenza since 1901. The building is characterized by classical elements in its facade on Corso Palladio and is organized around the square of the central courtyard.

- Palazzo Trissino al Duomo or Trissino Trento, in Via Cesare Battisti 10 45.546915°N 11.544098°E

Commissioned by Pier Francesco Trissino to Vincenzo Scamozzi in 1577 and later expanded by Giambattista Albanese in 1621–1622 for Achille Trissino, the founder's grandson. The facade remains a fine example of classical architecture, while most of the internal decorations have been lost. It has been a bank's headquarters since 1906.

- Palazzo Civena Trissino dal Vello d’Oro, in Viale Eretenio 12 45.543633°N 11.545901°E

Built by Andrea Palladio in 1540 for the brothers Giovanni Giacomo, Pier Antonio, Vincenzo, and Francesco Civena, it was Palladio's first city palace. It later became the residence of the Trissino dal Vello d’Oro counts, who significantly expanded it. It has been included in the list of Palladian monuments in the city, part of the UNESCO World Heritage List since 1994. It currently houses the Eretenia clinic.

- Palazzo Trissino Lanza, in Contrà Riale, corner of Stradella degli Stalli

A late Gothic building.

- Palazzo Trissino Clementi or Trissino Sperotti, in Contrà Porti 14

A 15th-century building in late Gothic style.

- Palazzo Trissino Conti Barbaran, in Contrà Santo Stefano

Built in the 16th century by Girolamo Trissino.

- Casa Trissino Menaldo, in Corso Palladio

Now a kindergarten.

- Birthplace of Giangiorgio Trissino, in Corso Fogazzaro 15

== V ==
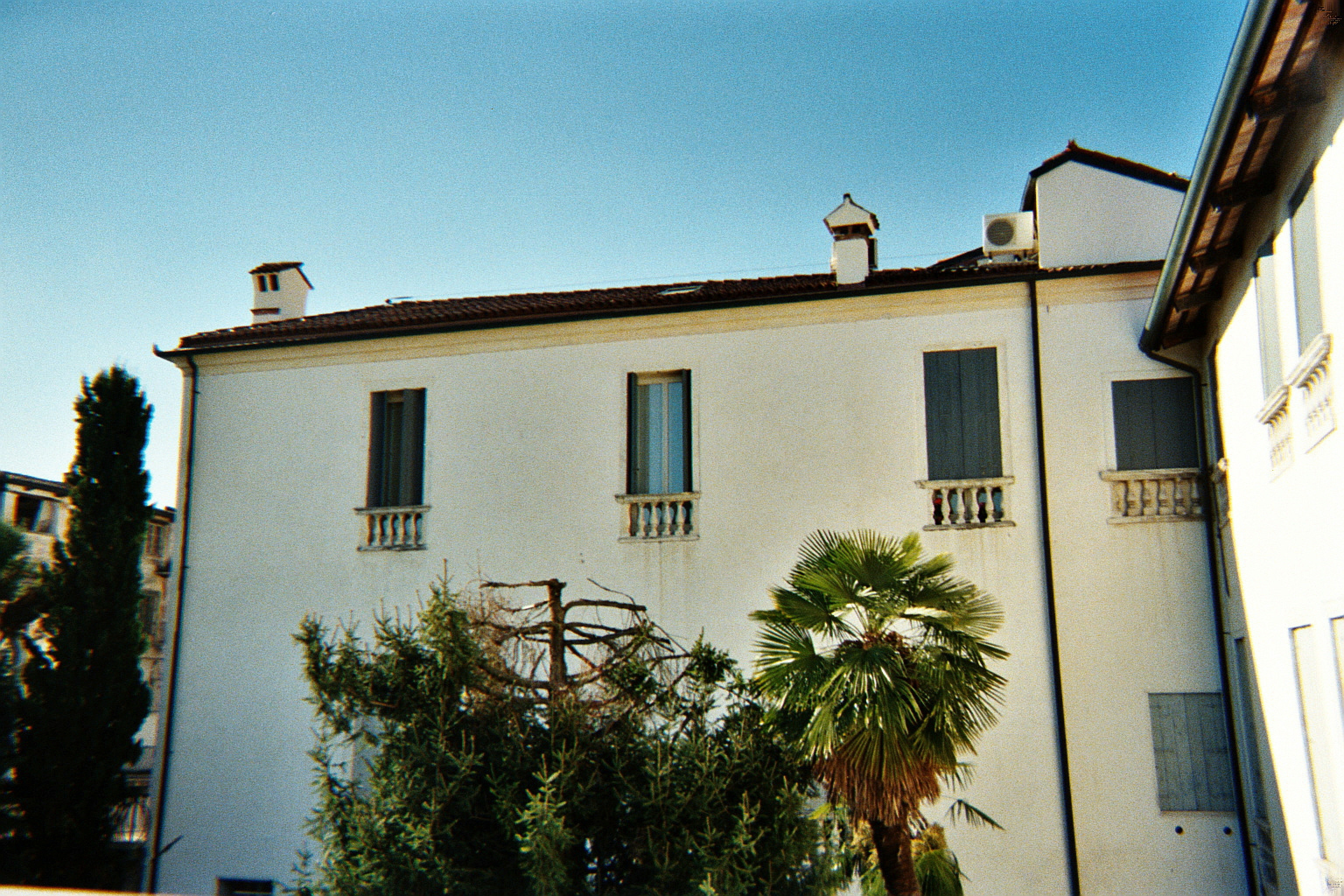
Palazzo Valle

- Palazzo Valle Marchesini Sala, in Contrà Busa San Michele

Equipped with a courtyard, large internal garden, and stables, it was commissioned in the second half of the 17th century by Count Ottaviano Valle, who hosted King of Denmark Frederick IV in December 1708. The architect was likely Francesco Albanese. In the 18th century, Count Giorgio Marchesini, affiliated with Freemasonry, established a Masonic lodge here in 1735 and commissioned frescoes by Giambattista Tiepolo and his son Giandomenico, who depicted Masonic symbols and various allegorical images. Some of these frescoes, removed at an unidentified time, are preserved at the Metropolitan Museum in New York and in other museums or collections. The palace had a large stable that could accommodate up to fourteen horses, a "botanical garden," and a "citrus grove." The quadraturist for the Tiepolo frescoes was Gerolamo Mengozzi Colonna. The palace was owned by the Raselli counts in the 19th century and by the Sala family from 1899 to 1980. It was restored between 1982 and 1986.

=== Valmarana palaces and houses ===
The Valmarana were an aristocratic Vicentine family, enrolled in the Venetian patriciate and counted among the so-called Case fatte per soldo (houses made for money).

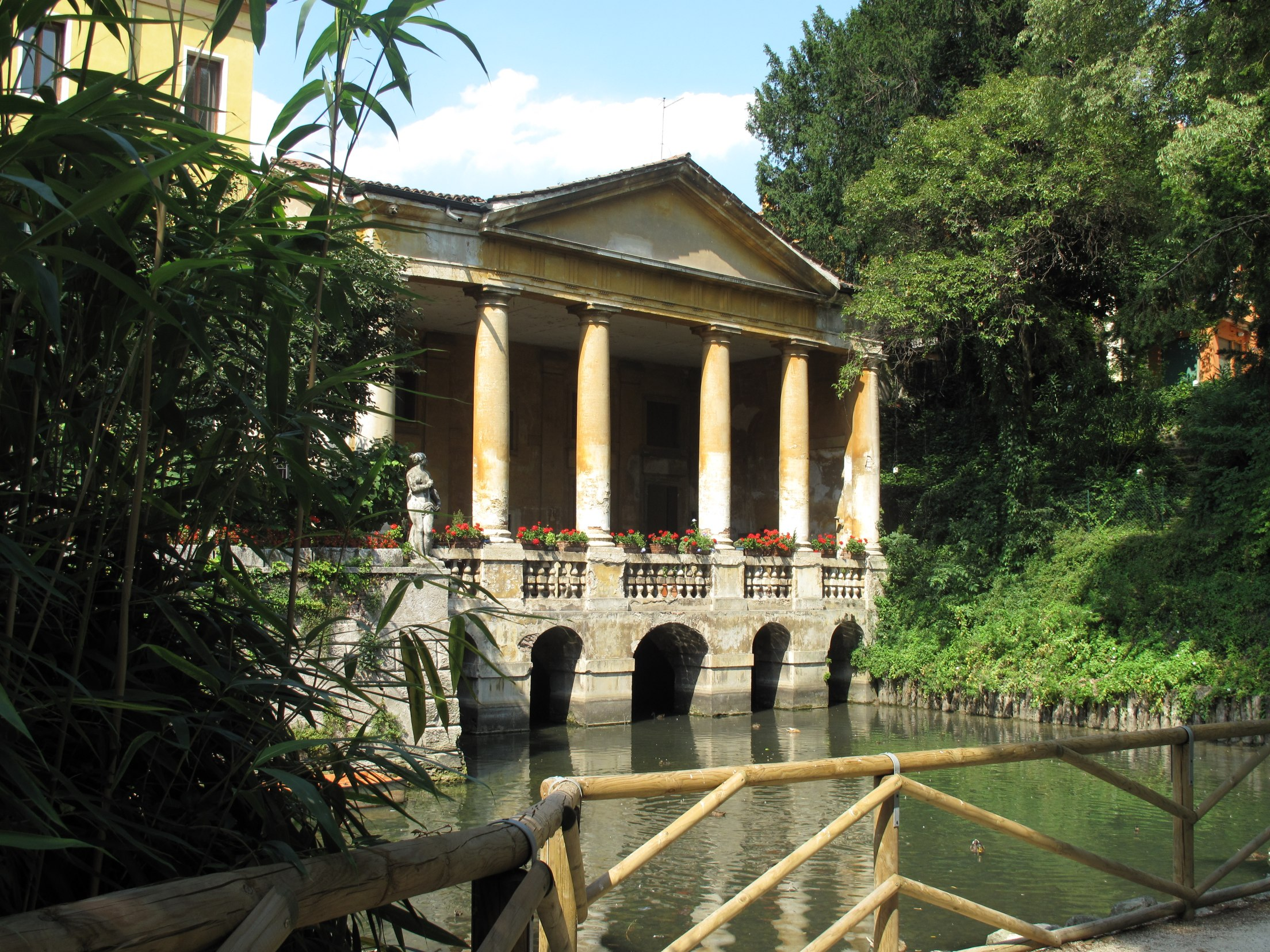
Loggia Valmarana within the Giardini Salvi

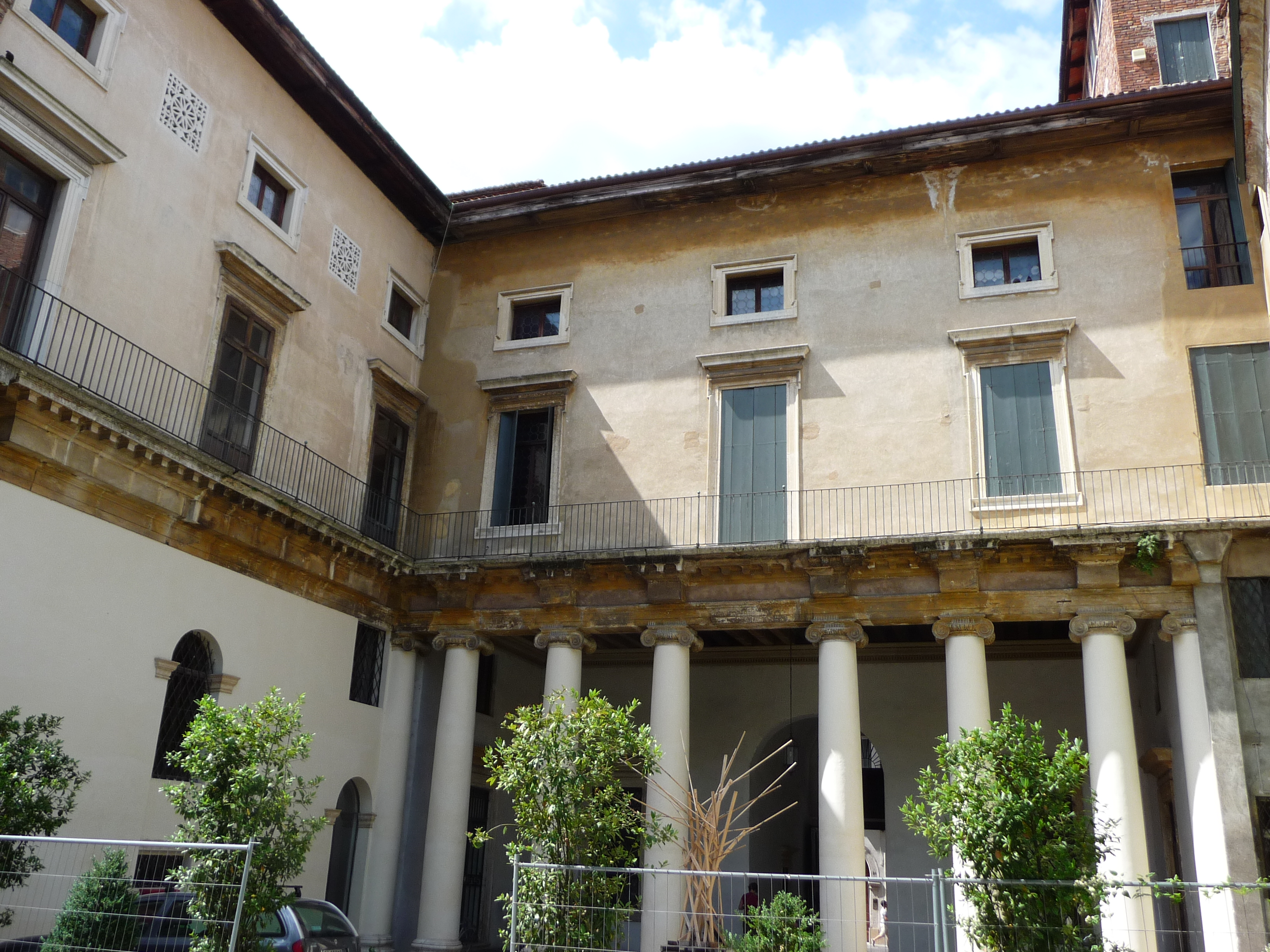
Inner courtyard of Palazzo Valmarana Braga Rosa

- Casa Valmarana, in Corso Fogazzaro 8–10

The first floor features French doors with 16th-century frames, a baluster frieze, and a cornice. The second floor was raised in the 19th century.

- Loggia Valmarana, in Giardini Salvi 45.54697°N 11.54022°E

Structured as a hexastyle Doric temple with five arches, it was intended by patron Gian Luigi Valmarana to serve as a meeting place for intellectuals and academics. It bears the date 1592 (inauguration of the gardens).

- Palazzo Valmarana Braga Rosa, in Corso Fogazzaro 16 45.54767°N 11.54363°E

A grandiose palace built in the seventh and eighth decades of the 16th century based on a design by Andrea Palladio. Partially rebuilt after World War II, it remains the only palace to retain its original plaster and marble facade.

- Palazzo Valmarana Rossi, in Corso Fogazzaro 18

Built in the early Renaissance but restored between the 17th and 18th centuries.

- Palazzo Valmarana Salvi, corner of Corso Palladio and Contrà Santa Corona

A 16th-century palace, remodeled in the last decades of the 20th century.

- Palazzetto Valmarana, in Contrà Santa Corona, adjacent to Palazzo Valmarana Salvi

An early Renaissance building.

- Palazzetto Valmarana, in Contrà Santi Apostoli

A late neoclassical building from 1843 by Carlo Greco.

- Case Valmarana, facing Giardini Salvi across the Seriola

One, a 1847 building incorporating neo-15th-century motifs, remodeled by Giovanni Maria Negrin Quartesan. Another, a 17th-century structure with a dissociated central Serlian window.

- Palazzo Valmarana Fogazzaro, in Contrà Carpagnon

In late neoclassical style.

- Palazzo Valmarana Franco, in Contrà San Faustino 19

A 16th-century building.

- Palazzo Trento Valmarana, in Contrà Cabianca, corner of Contrà San Faustino

An 18th-century building.

See also

- Valmarana Chapel in the Church of Santa Corona.

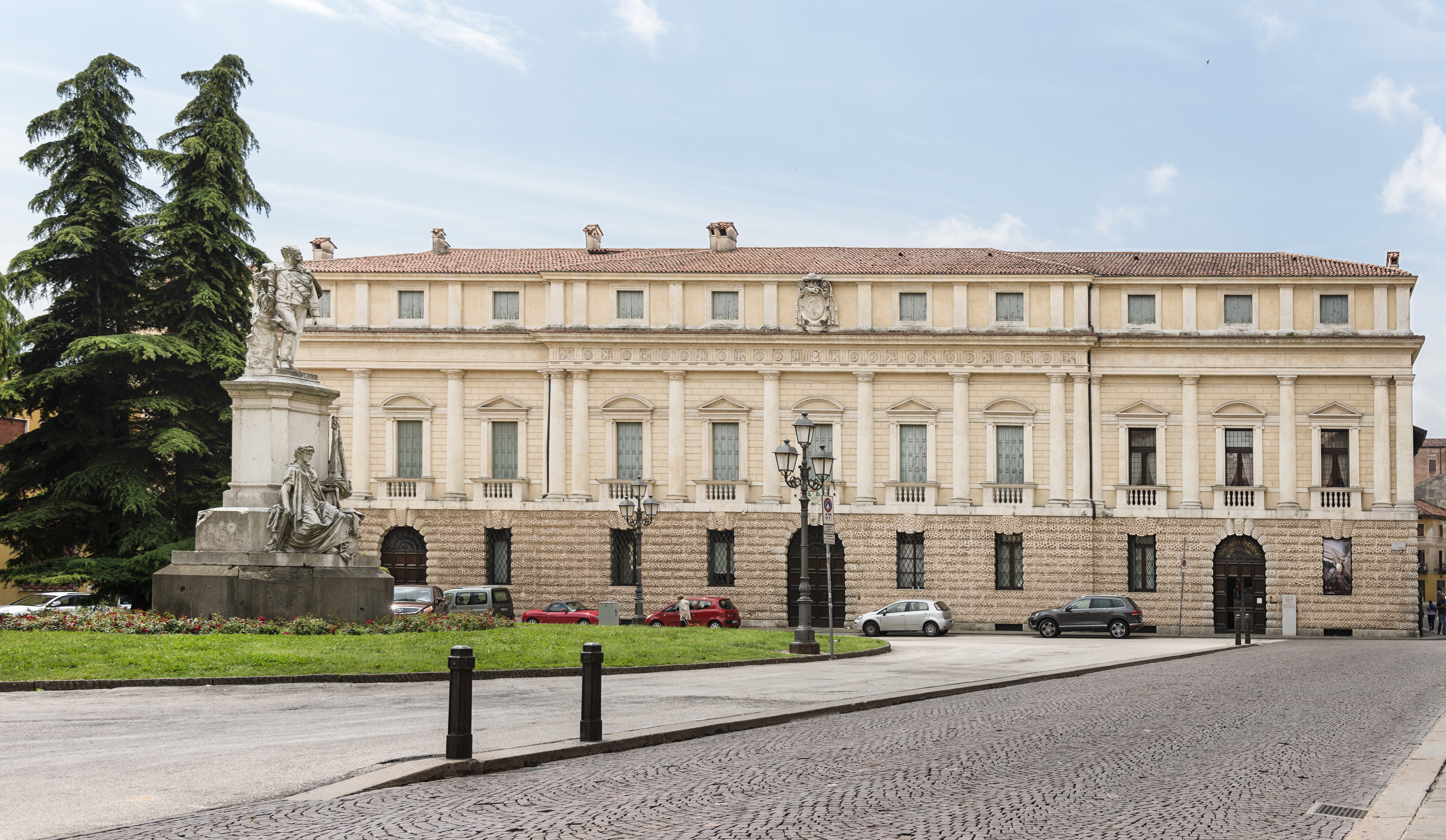
Episcopal Palace

- Palazzo Vecchia Romanelli, between Contrà Cantarane and Motton San Lorenzo

Built in the mid-18th century based on a design by Giorgio Massari, it has its main facade in the Porta Nova district, which was being developed at the time, and a secondary facade facing the city along the route of the early medieval walls.

- Palazzo Velo, in Contrà Carpagnon

Built straddling the 17th and 18th centuries, possibly by Giacomo Borella.

- Palazzo Velo, in Contrà Lodi, corner of Contrà Cantarane

A 1706 work by Francesco Muttoni.

- Episcopal Palace or Vescovado, in Piazza Duomo 10 45.5457°N 11.54361°E

A large and historic palace, seat of the bishop and the Diocesan Museum, rebuilt several times.

- Palazzetto Vigna, in Contrà Catena

An expression of Vicentine early Renaissance architecture.

- Palazzo Volpe Maltauro, in Contrà Gazzolle

Built in the mid-16th century as a renovation of a late Gothic building. Now the seat of the Prefecture.

- Palazzo Volpe Cabianca, in Contrà Cabianca 8, corner of Stradella Piancoli 45.54740°N 11.54915°E

A Gothic building, remodeled in the late 16th century and in the 19th century by Antonio Caregaro Negrin.

== Z ==
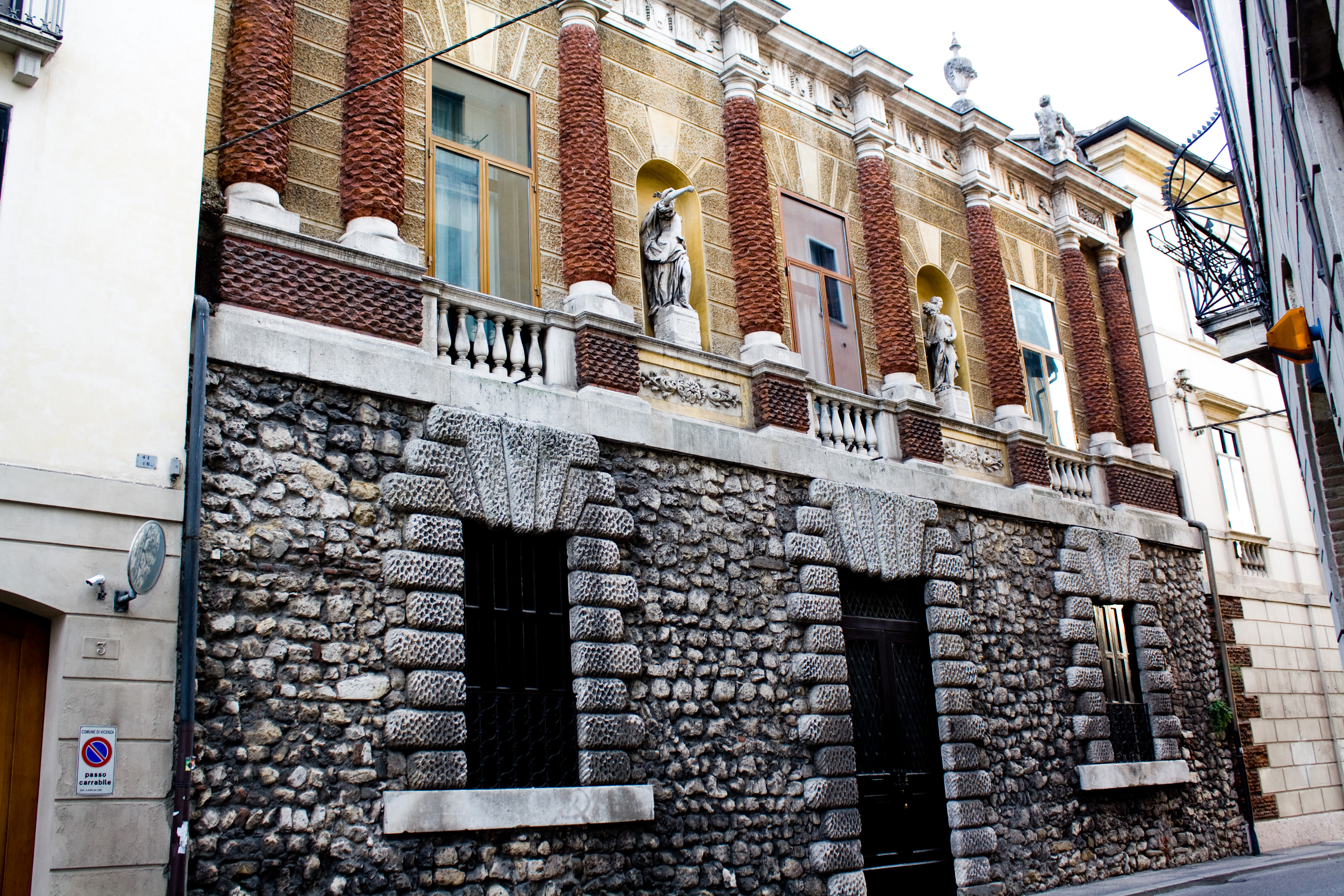
Palazzina Zamberlan

- Palazzina Zamberlan, in Contrà Porton del Luzo 5

A late 19th-century neoclassical building by Carlo Morseletto, constructed on remnants of the first city walls.

- Palazzetto Zamboni, in Piazza Matteotti 22–24

An interesting example of minor 18th-century architecture.

- Casa Zen, in Corso Palladio

A building from the second half of the 19th century.

== See also ==
- Vicenza
- History of Vicenza
- Palladian villas of the Veneto

== Bibliography ==
- Barbieri, Franco (2004). Vicenza, ritratto di una città [Vicenza, Portrait of a City] (in Italian). Vicenza: Angelo Colla editore. ISBN 88-900990-7-0.
- Sacchi, Filippo (1963). Case e palazzi di Vicenza [Houses and Palaces of Vicenza] (in Italian). Vicenza: Neri Pozza editore.
