= Villa Trissino =

Villa Trissino is the name of many villas of the Trissino family in the province of Vicenza, Veneto region of Italy. Two of them were designed by or traditionally attributed to Andrea Palladio:

- Villa Trissino (Meledo di Sarego), unfinished
- Villa Trissino (Cricoli) in Vicenza
