= City of Vicenza and the Palladian Villas of the Veneto =

World Heritage Site in Italy

UNESCO World Heritage Site
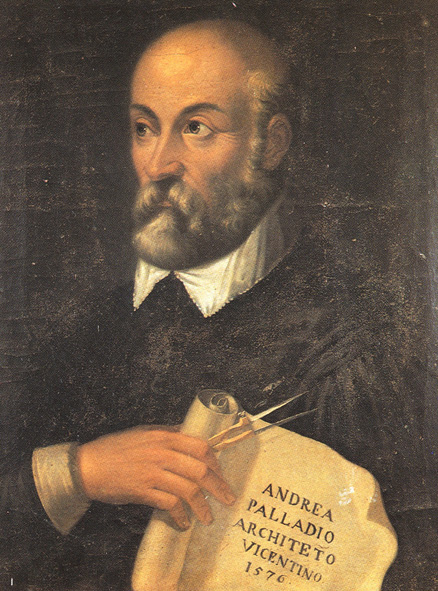
- Architect Andrea Palladio

- Location within Veneto Location within Italy
- Location: Veneto, Italy
- Criteria: Cultural: (i), (ii)
- Reference: 712bis
- Inscription: 1994 (18th Session)
- Extensions: 1996
- Area: 333.87 ha (825.0 acres)
- Coordinates: 45°32′57″N 11°32′58″E

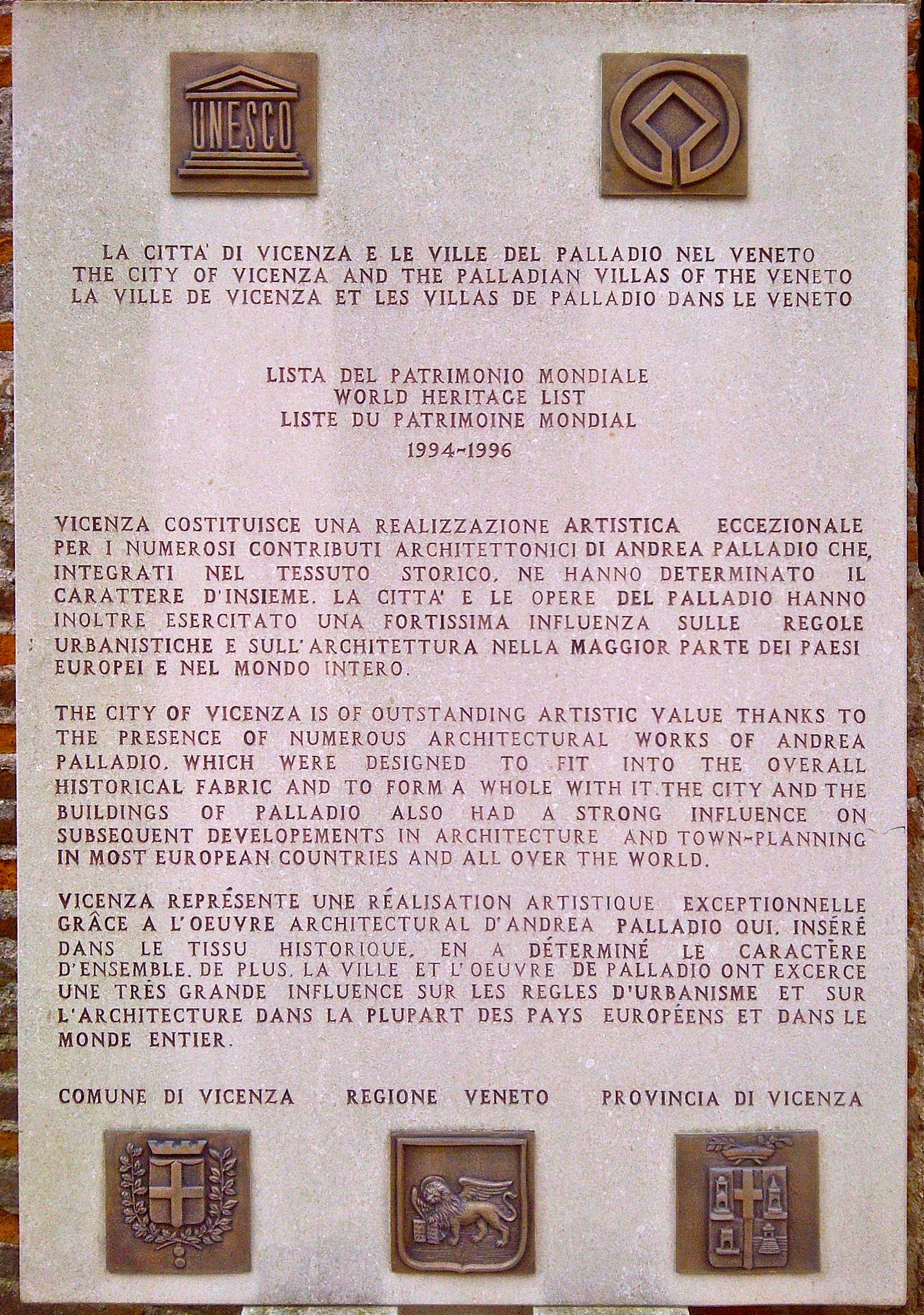
Plaque for Vicenza in the UNESCO World Heritage List

City of Vicenza and the Palladian Villas of the Veneto is a World Heritage Site in Italy, which protects buildings by the architect Andrea Palladio. UNESCO inscribed the site on the World Heritage List in 1994. At first the site was called "Vicenza, City of Palladio" and only buildings in the immediate area of Vicenza were included.

Various types of buildings were represented in the original site, which included the Basilica Palladiana, Teatro Olimpico and palazzi in the city itself, along with a few villas in the vicinity. However, most of Palladio's surviving villas lay outside the site. In 1996 the site was expanded. Its present name reflects the fact that it includes all the Palladian Villas of the Veneto. City of Vicenza and the Palladian Villas of the Veneto also has some examples of ecclesiastical architecture, including the relatively small church at Maser. In total there are 47 Palladian buildings registered in the UNESCO list in the Veneto region.

There is another important group of urban buildings by Palladio in Venice, a city which also has World Heritage Site status. Venice has notable examples of ecclesiastical architecture by Palladio, including the San Giorgio Maggiore (church), Venice.

== List of sites in the center of Vicenza ==
The World Heritage List have been registered since 1994: the historic center of Vicenza with the 23 Palladian monuments located within the ancient medieval walls of the city.

Site	Image	Description
Arco delle Scalette		Arch built in 1596, whose design is attributed to Palladio, about 1575. It is located in the south-eastern border of the historic center of the city of Vicenza, and it was the only point of access from the city to the sanctuary of Monte Berico.
Basilica Palladiana		Centrally located in Vicenza's Piazza dei Signori, of which Palladio himself said that "it might stand comparison with any similar work of antiquity"
Teatro Olimpico		Designed for the Accademia Olimpica (Olympic Academy) and begun to be built in 1580, when Palladio died. The wooden scenes are by Vincenzo Scamozzi
Palazzo Chiericati		Home of the city pinacotheca
Palazzo del Capitaniato		The palazzo is currently used by the town council, inside the Sala Bernarda.
Palazzo Porto		
Palazzo Thiene Bonin Longare		(built by Vincenzo Scamozzi)
Palazzo Thiene		
Palazzo Valmarana		
Palazzo Barbaran da Porto		Home of the Museo Palladio
Palazzetto Capra sul Corso		
Palazzo Civena		
Casa Cogollo		“House of Palladio”
Palazzo da Monte Migliorini		
Palazzo Garzadori		
Palazzo Pojana		
Palazzo Porto in Piazza Castello		(incomplete)
Palazzo Schio		
Loggia Valmarana		
Dome of the cathedral		
Northern portal of the Cathedral		
Portal of Santa Maria in Foro dei Servi		
Santa Maria Nova, Vicenza		

== List of villas ==
Later in 1996, the site was extended by inserting another 24 Palladian villas distributed in the Veneto region

#	Name	Location	Province	Image	Coordinates
712-002	Villa Trissino	Vicenza	Vicenza		45°33′55″N 11°32′49″E
712-003	Villa Gazzotti Grimani	Vicenza	Vicenza		45°33′13″N 11°34′30″E
712-004	Villa Almerico Capra, «La Rotonda»	Vicenza	Vicenza		45°31′54″N 11°33′36″E
712-005	Villa Angarano	Bassano del Grappa	Vicenza		45°46′50″N 11°43′25″E
712-006	Villa Caldogno	Caldogno	Vicenza		45°36′26″N 11°30′24″E
712-007	Villa Chiericati	Grumolo delle Abbadesse	Vicenza		45°30′16″N 11°39′12″E
712-008	Villa Forni Cerato	Montecchio Precalcino	Vicenza		45°39′11″N 11°33′40″E
712-009	Villa Godi	Lonedo di Lugo Vicentino	Vicenza		45°44′44″N 11°31′43″E
712-010	Villa Pisani	Bagnolo di Lonigo	Vicenza		45°21′31″N 11°22′10″E
712-011	Villa Poiana	Poiana Maggiore	Vicenza		45°16′54″N 11°30′03″E
712-012	Villa Saraceno	Agugliaro	Vicenza		45°18′38″N 11°35′12″E
712-013	Villa Thiene	Quinto Vicentino	Vicenza		45°34′22″N 11°37′47″E
712-014	Villa Trissino	Sarego	Vicenza		45°25′42″N 11°24′49″E
712-015	Villa Valmarana	Bolzano Vicentino	Vicenza		45°35′01″N 11°36′41″E
712-016	Villa Valmarana	Monticello Conte Otto	Vicenza		45°34′58″N 11°35′40″E
712-017	Villa Badoer, «La Badoera»	Fratta Polesine	Rovigo		45°01′48″N 11°38′46″E
712-018	Villa Barbaro	Maser	Treviso		45°48′20″N 11°58′48″E
712-019	Villa Emo	Vedelago	Treviso		45°42′43″N 11°59′23″E
712-020	Villa Zeno	Cessalto	Treviso		45°42′11″N 12°38′20″E
712-021	Villa Foscari, «La Malcontenta»	Mira	Venice		45°26′07″N 12°12′01″E
712-022	Villa Pisani	Montagnana	Padua		45°13′37″N 11°28′07″E
712-023	Villa Cornaro	Piombino Dese	Padua		45°36′14″N 11°59′57″E
712-024	Villa Serego	San Pietro in Cariano	Verona		45°29′58″N 10°55′32″E
712-025	Villa Piovene	Lugo Vicentino	Vicenza		45°44′48″N 11°31′36″E

== See also ==
- Palladian architecture
