= Palazzo Thiene Bonin Longare =

UNESCO World Heritage Site
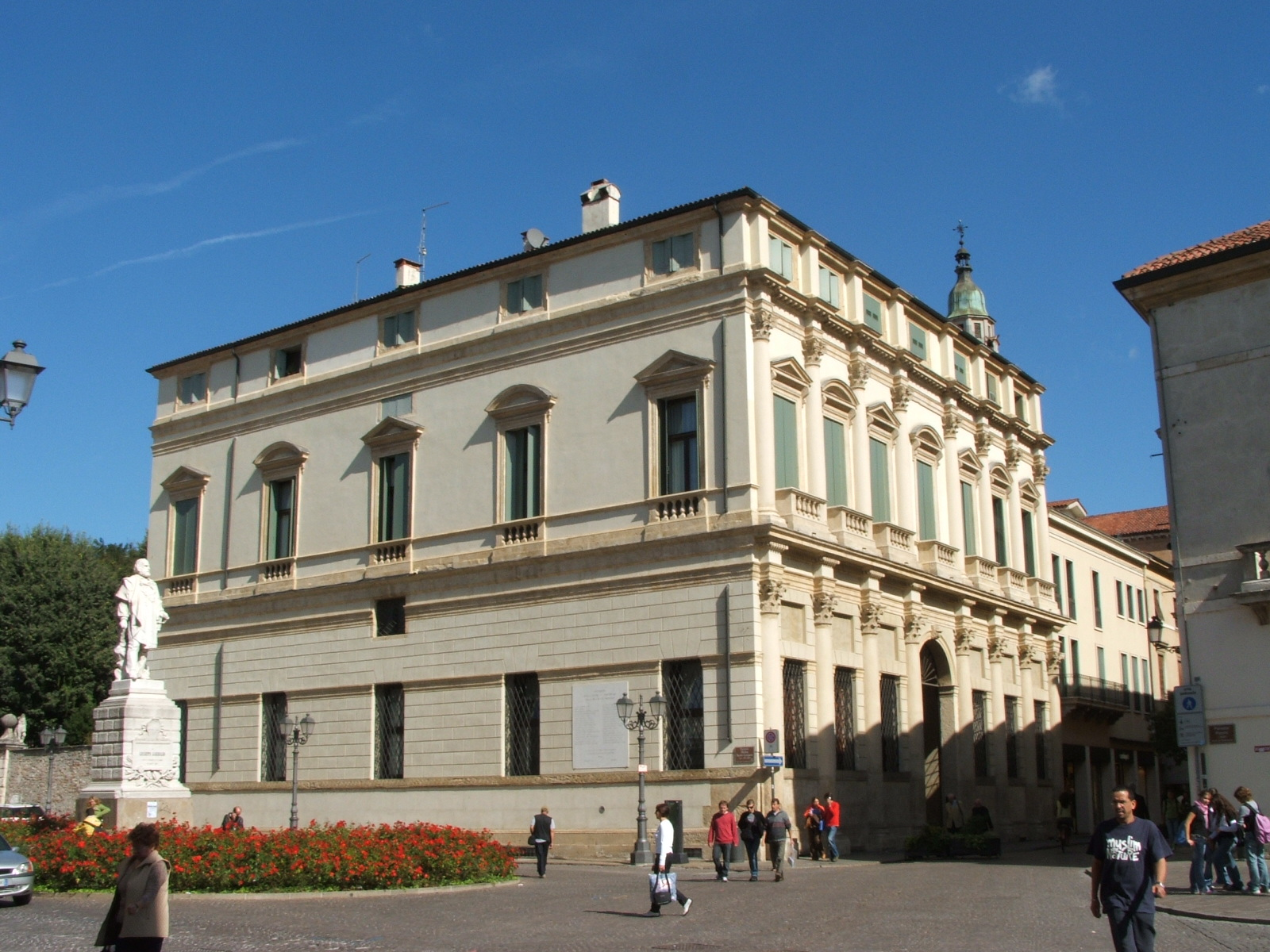
- Palazzo Thiene Bonin Longare (view from Piazza Castello)

- Location within Veneto Location within Italy
- Location: Vicenza, Province of Vicenza, Veneto, Italy
- Part of: "City of Vicenza" part of City of Vicenza and the Palladian Villas of the Veneto
- Criteria: Cultural: (i)(ii)
- Reference: 712bis-001
- Inscription: 1994 (18th Session)
- Extensions: 1996
- Coordinates: 45°32′47″N 11°32′30″E

Palazzo Thiene Bonin Longare is a patrician palace in Vicenza, northern Italy, designed by Italian Renaissance architect Andrea Palladio, probably in 1572, and built after Palladio's death by Vincenzo Scamozzi. It is one of the city palazzi of the Thiene family that Palladio worked upon, the other being Palazzo Thiene in the near contrà Porti.

Since 1994 the palace has formed part of a UNESCO World Heritage Site the current name of which is "City of Vicenza and the Palladian Villas of the Veneto".

== History ==
There are more doubts than certainties surrounding the history of the urban villa that Francesco Thiene built on family properties at the eastern extremity of the Strada Maggiore (today the Corso Palladio), beginning with the exact date of its construction. At Palladio’s death the building had still not been executed: on the Pianta Angelica of 1580, in fact, there still appear only old houses and a garden. A document of 1586 records that construction had still not begun, but certainly in 1593, on the death of the patron Francesco Thiene, the palace was at least a third built. Enea Thiene, who inherited the estate of his uncle Francesco, carried works to their conclusion, probably within the first decade of the 17th century. In 1835 the palace was acquired by Lelio Bonin Longare.

In his treatise L'idea della architettura universale (published in Venice in 1615), Vincenzo Scamozzi writes that he was responsible for completing the building’s construction on the basis of a project by another architect (without specifying whom) with certain revisions to the original design (which, he does not clarify). The architect that Scamozzi does not name is certainly Andrea Palladio, because two autograph sheets survive which can be referred to Francesco Thiene’s palace: on these are traced two plan variants, substantially close to the present building, as well as a sketch for the façade which is very different from that executed. It is unclear when Palladio formulated his own ideas for the palazzo, but it is credible that he did so in 1572, the year in which Francesco Thiene and his uncle Orazio divided up the family properties and the former obtained the very site where Palladio’s edifice would rise.

== Architecture ==
If one analyses the realised building, various elements stand out which favour a dating to the 1570s: for example, the many points of contact with the Palazzo Barbaran da Porto, both in the design of the lower part and in the great, double-storey loggia of the courtyard. Instead, the side could be the work of Vincenzo Scamozzi, given its affinities with the Palazzo Trissino by the Duomo. The deep atrium, which is substantially indifferent to the grid of architectural orders, could also be by Scamozzi and while the rooms on its right, as one enters, clearly reuse rather irregular, pre-existing walls, those on the left are perfectly regular and evidently rise from new foundations.

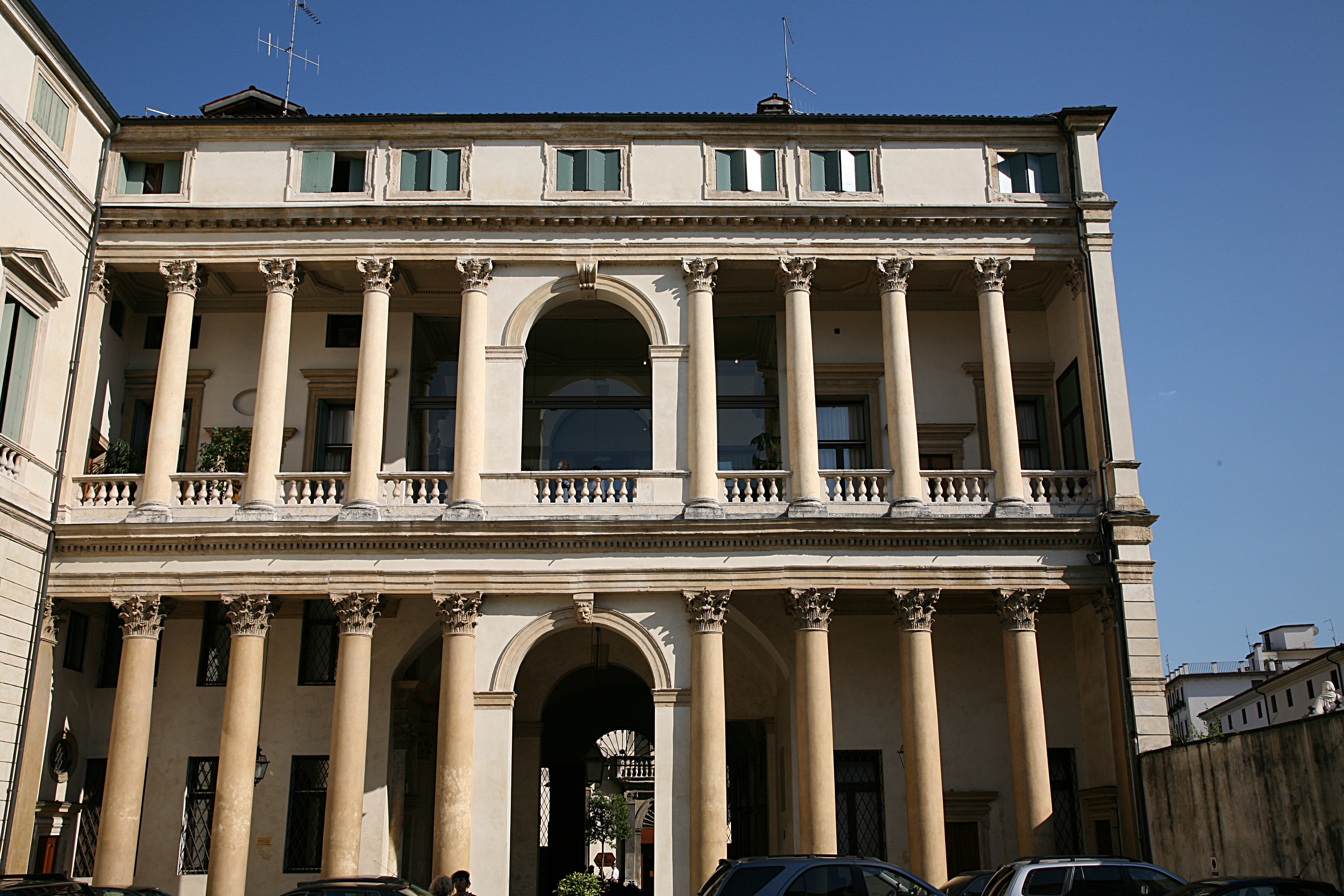
The double-storey loggia in the courtyard

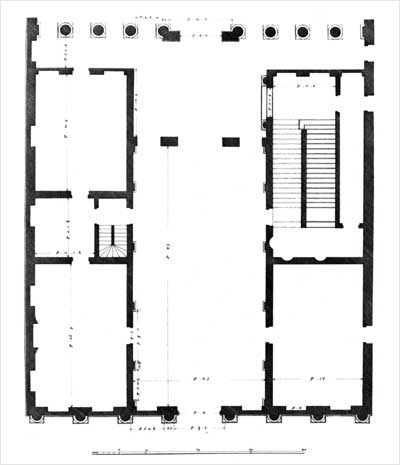
Floor plan (drawing by Ottavio Bertotti Scamozzi, 1776)

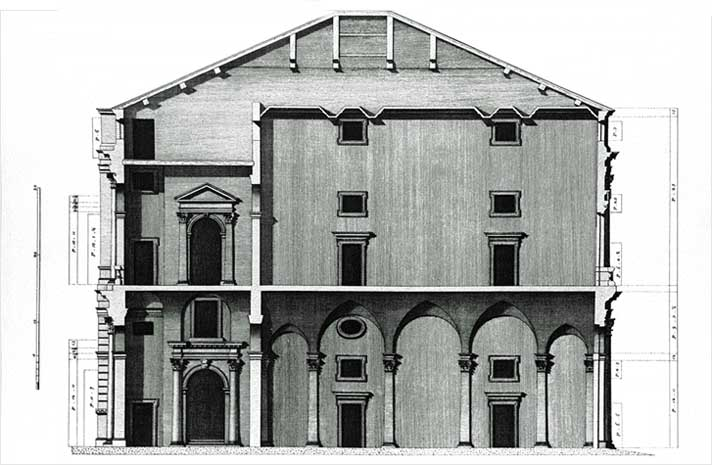
Section (drawing by Ottavio Bertotti Scamozzi, 1776)

== See also ==
- Villa Thiene
