= Palazzo Civena =

Renaissance palace in Vicenza, Veneto, Italy

Coordinates: 45°32′36″N 11°32′45″E

UNESCO World Heritage Site
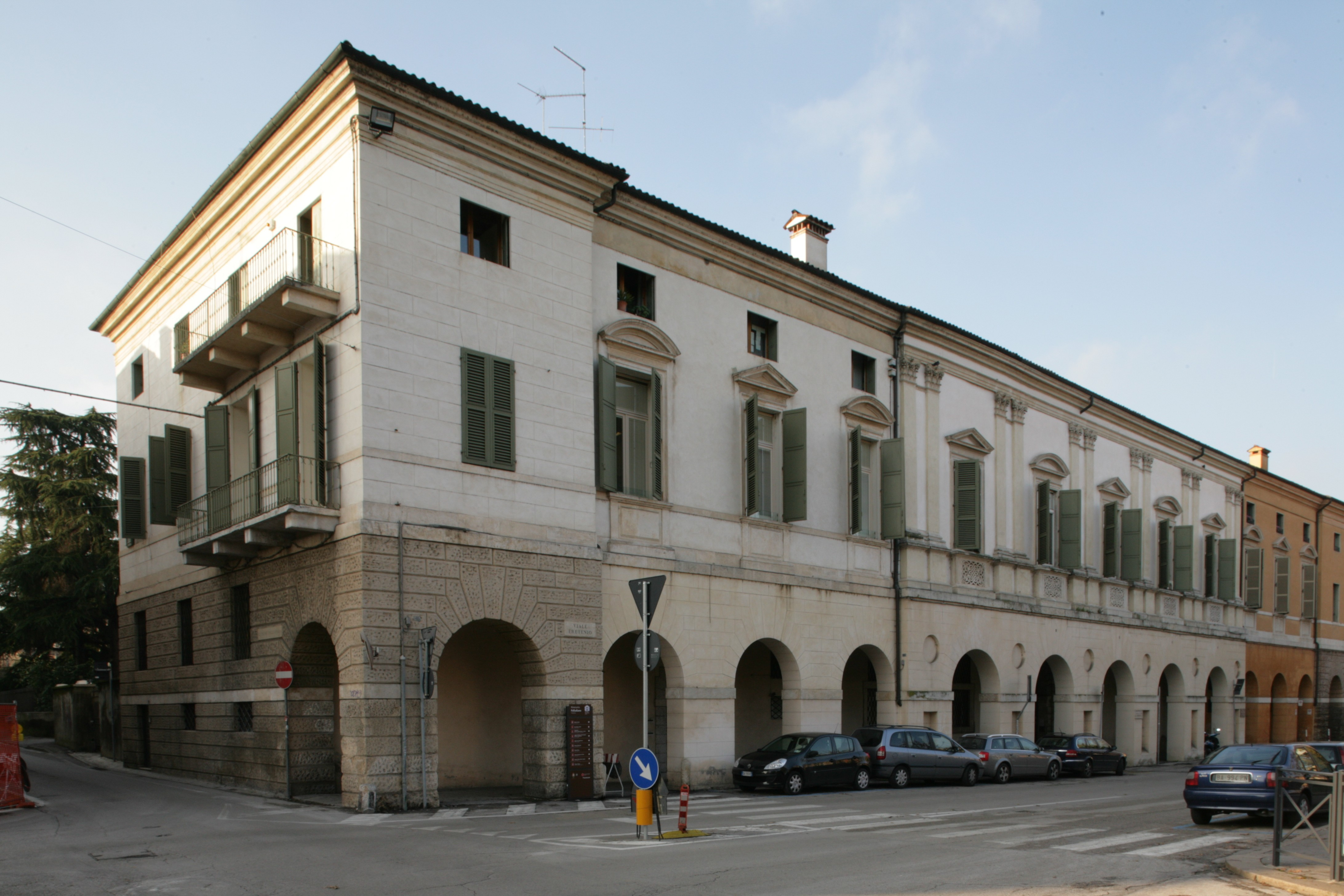

- Location within Veneto Location within Italy
- Location: Vicenza, Veneto, Italy
- Part of: City of Vicenza and the Palladian Villas of the Veneto
- Criteria: Cultural: (i)(ii)
- Reference: 712bis-001
- Inscription: 1994 (18th Session)

Palazzo Civena is a Renaissance palace in Vicenza, Italy, dating to 1540. It was the first palace designed by Andrea Palladio for Giovanni Civena.

== History ==
The date "1540" engraved on the foundation medal, preserved in the Museo Civico di Vicenza, fixes the laying of the foundation stone to that year. The building was probably finished twenty-four months later, six months before the start of works on the Palazzo Thiene. The history of the palace includes being heavily modified by Domenico Cerato in 1750, being half destroyed by Allied bombardment during World War II (with the Teatro Eretenio at his side) and thence reconstructed only for its façade.

== Architecture ==
Palazzo Civena was not included in the Quattro Libri dell'Architettura by Palladio (1570), but various autograph drawings by Palladio exist to document the several alternatives he elaborated during the design stage.

According to Douglas Lewis, the curator of the 1981 exhibition The Drawings of Palladio, the design "was a rather safe job which borrowed motifs from other architects, the kind of thing a young architect will do to win a patron's confidence."

Today's distribution of internal spaces does not replicate Palladio's definitive idea but is the fruit of Cerato's heavy interventions, which prolonged the atrium and modified the stairs. The original plan, however, may be reconstructed thanks to a 19th-century survey published in 1776 by Ottavio Bertotti Scamozzi (according to whom it was obtained from the proprietors): the grouping of rooms in two nuclei placed to either side of the atrium, with a serliana providing the filter to the exterior, is very close to Palladio's villa projects in the same years.

The very early date of the project makes Palazzo Civena evidence of Palladio's youthful activity and his architectural culture before the journey to Rome in 1541. As was already the case with the villa at Cricoli, this building marks a rupture with constructional praxis in Vicenza: the traditional polifora at the centre of the façade has been substituted with a regular sequence of bays, rhythmically articulated by paired pilasters. In this respect Palladio was evidently inspired by the Roman palaces of the early 16th-century (Cinquecento), but it is clear that this did not result from direct acquaintance: the building's façade is devoid of any real plastic substance and seems cut from a sheet of paper. Moreover, all the elements of his architectural vocabulary derive from Venetian models, not Roman ones, above all the buildings realised by Giovanni Maria Falconetto in Padua.

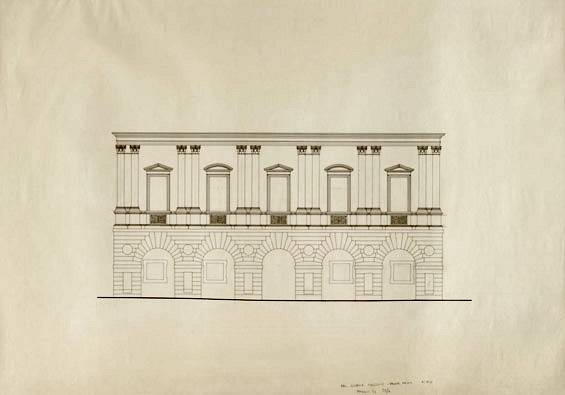
Façade (Andrzej e Ewa Pereswet Soltan, 1977)

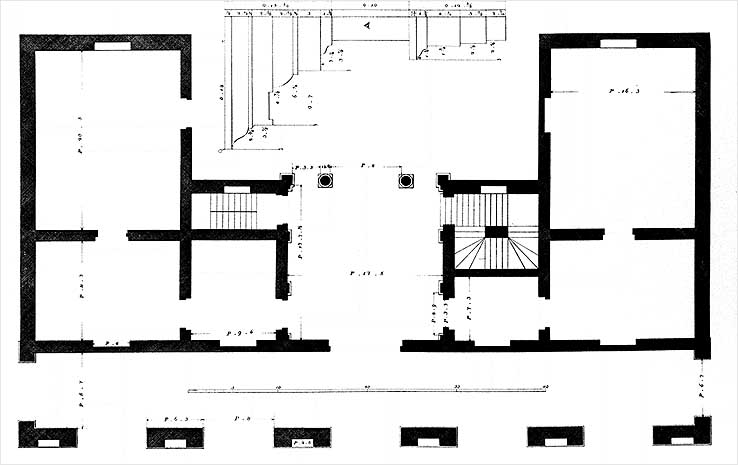
Floor plan (Ottavio Bertotti Scamozzi, 1776)

== See also ==
Media related to Palazzo Civena (Vicenza) at Wikimedia Commons
