= Villa Serego =

Palladian villa in province of Verona, northern Italy

UNESCO World Heritage Site
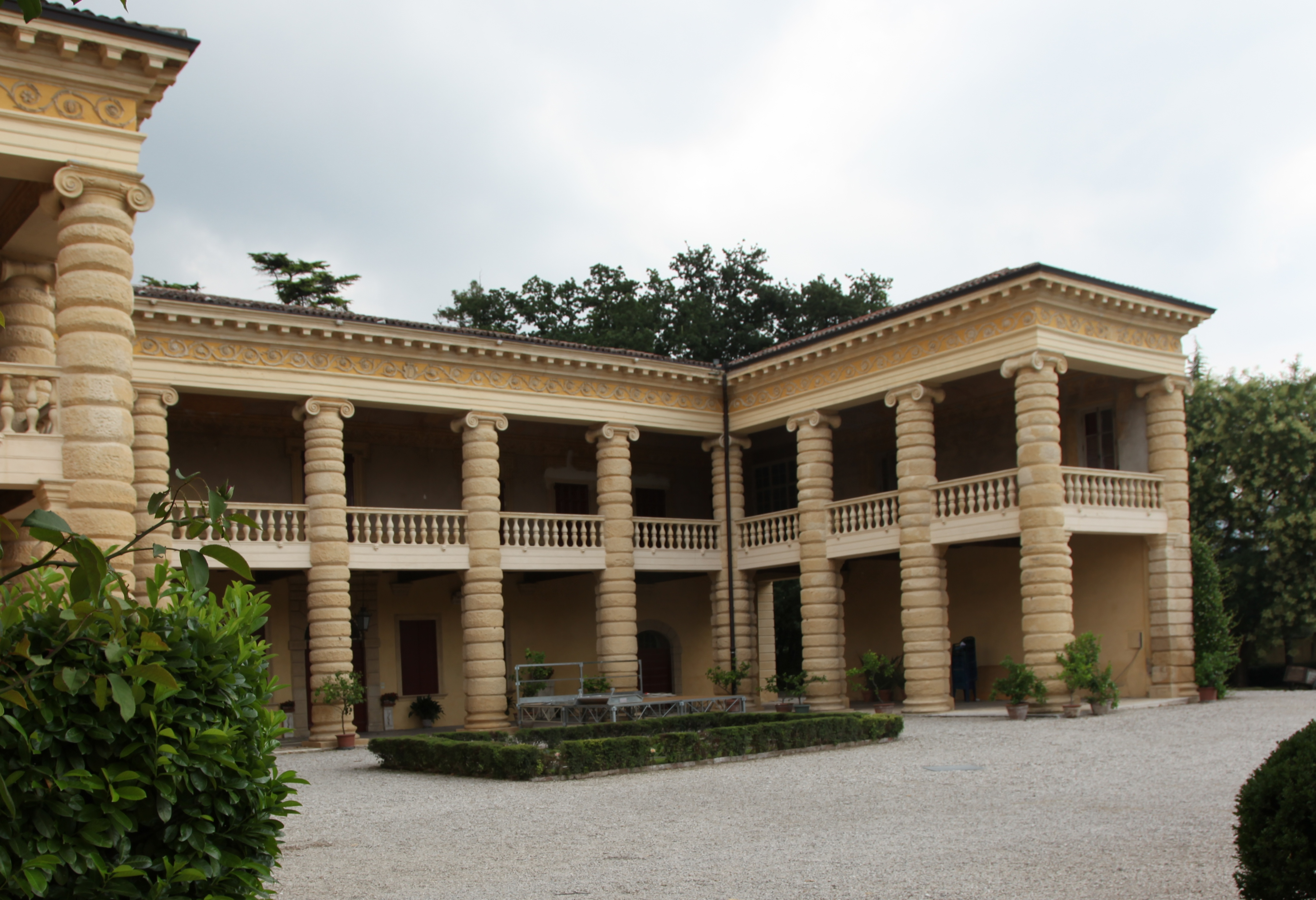
- Villa Serego

- Location within Veneto Location within Italy
- Location: San Pietro in Cariano, Province of Verona, Veneto, Italy
- Part of: City of Vicenza and the Palladian Villas of the Veneto
- Criteria: Cultural: (i), (ii)
- Reference: 712bis-024
- Inscription: 1994 (18th Session)
- Extensions: 1996
- Area: 2.78 ha (6.9 acres)
- Coordinates: 45°29′58″N 10°55′32″E

Villa Serego or Villa Sarego is a Palladian villa at Santa Sofia di Pedemonte, San Pietro in Cariano in the province of Verona, northern Italy. It was built for the aristocratic Sarego family, and designed by Italian Renaissance architect Andrea Palladio. The villa is distinctive for its use of rusticated columns of the Ionic order.

== History ==
The villa was commissioned by the Venetian nobleman Marcantonio Sarego for an estate which came into his possession in 1552. A rough date for its execution is c. 1560–1570. A plan of the building appears in Palladio's I quattro libri dell'architettura of 1570, but it relates to a larger project than was actually completed. A habitable building is known to have existed by 1572 from Marcantonio's will of that date, but he died leaving some of the project as little more than foundations.

In 1857, further construction took place, which makes the villa appear finished but does not fully respect the original design.

== Architecture ==
Two limestone sculptures stand surrounded by semi-circular hedges in front of the villa. They appear to be the deities Diana (with attributes of the hunt) and Apollo (holding a harp), symbolic of the villa being both a rural retreat and a refuge for culture and beauty.

The villa is built around a courtyard, which is derived from the atrium of Roman villas. Palladio was familiar with such designs from his research into ancient Roman architecture, but courtyards are rare in his own buildings.

The colossal columns of the courtyard are executed in a rough aesthetic – Palladio refers to them being made of "non polite" stone. Although ultimately derived from ancient Roman buildings, the columns are reminiscent of Mannerist design and have features found in the architecture of Verona. They are practically unique in Palladio's work, but are echoed in a gateway at Villa Trissino (Meledo di Sarego).

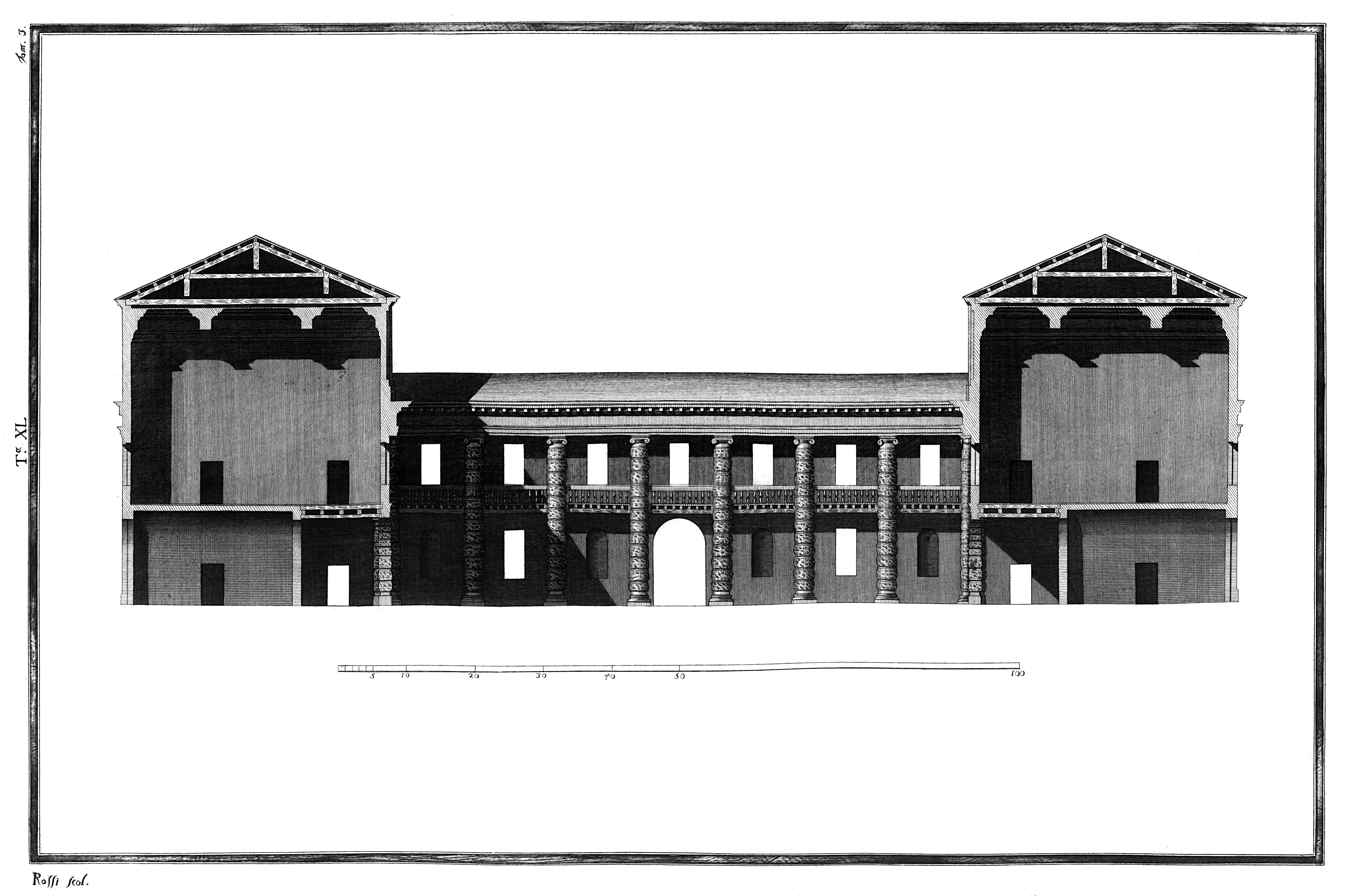
Cross section (drawing by Ottavio Bertotti Scamozzi, 1781)

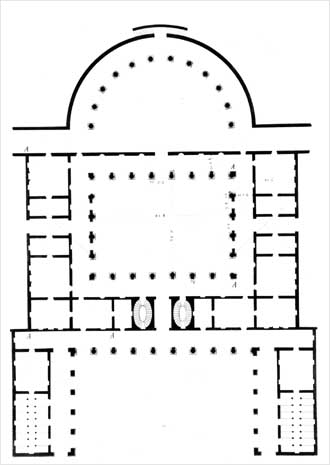
Floor plan (Ottavio Bertotti Scamozzi, 1781)

== Conservation ==
In 1996, UNESCO included the villa in the World Heritage Site "City of Vicenza and Palladian Villas of the Veneto".

It is not open to the public.

== See also ==
- Palladian Villas of the Veneto
- Palladian architecture
