= Santa Maria Nova, Vicenza =

Church in Vicenza, Italy

Coordinates: 45°32′54″N 11°32′15″E

Church of Santa Maria Nuova
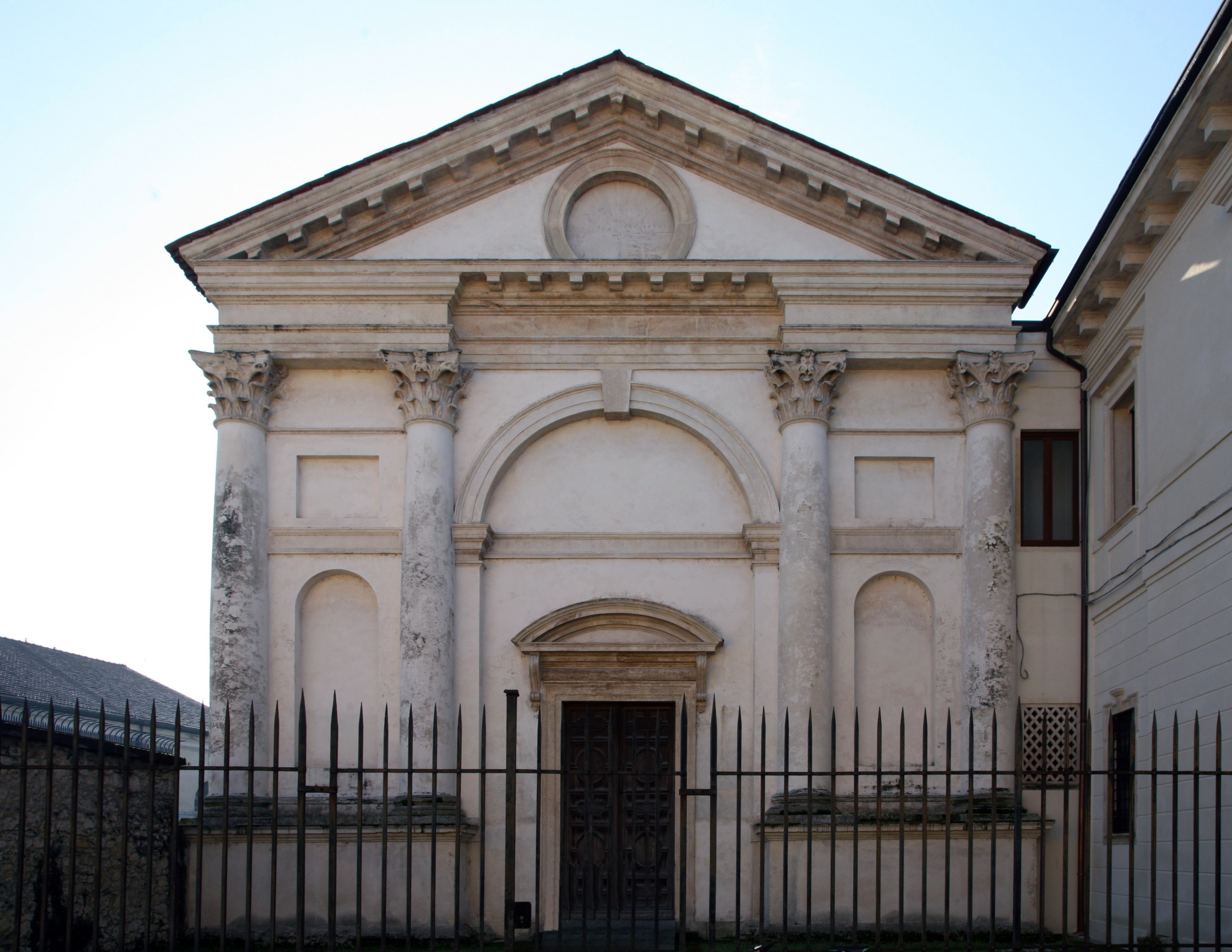

Religion
- Affiliation: Roman Catholic

Location
- Location: Vicenza, Veneto, Italy
- Interactive map of Church of Santa Maria Nuova

Architecture
- Architects: Andrea Palladio, Domenico Groppino
- Type: Church
- Style: Renaissance
- Groundbreaking: 1578
- Completed: 1590
- UNESCO World Heritage Site
- Official name: City of Vicenza and the Palladian Villas of the Veneto
- Type: Cultural
- Criteria: C (i) (ii)
- Designated: 1994, 1996
- Reference no.: 712bis-001
- State Party: Italy
- Region: Europe and North America

Santa Maria Nova is a Roman Catholic church in Vicenza attributed to 1578 designs by Italian Renaissance architect Andrea Palladio. It is the only complete church design in Vicenza assigned to Palladio, although he did design the Valmarana chapel in Santa Corona, a portal and the cupola of the Cathedral, and the portal of Santa Maria dei Servi.

== History ==
In 1578, a nobleman from Vicenza, Lodovico Trento, funded the reconstruction of a church adjacent to the Augustinian convent of Santa Maria Nova in Borgo Porta Nuova, in the west of the city. Members of the aristocracy often joined this convent. The church was completed by 1590. Decoration of the interior, including ceiling and wall paintings, were completed by Francesco Maffei, Andrea Vicentino, Palma il Giovane, Giulio Carpioni, and also by Alessandro Maganza and his studio. The works were dispersed during the nineteenth century when the church was deconsecrated. The only construction documents list as capomaestro, Domenico Groppino, who worked on other Palladian structures.

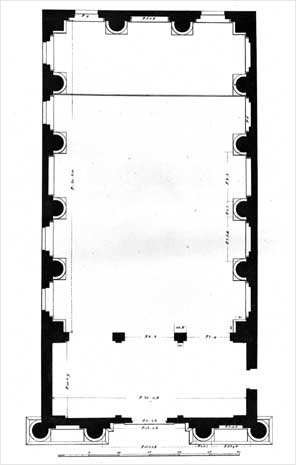
Plan (drawing by Ottavio Bertotti Scamozzi, 1776

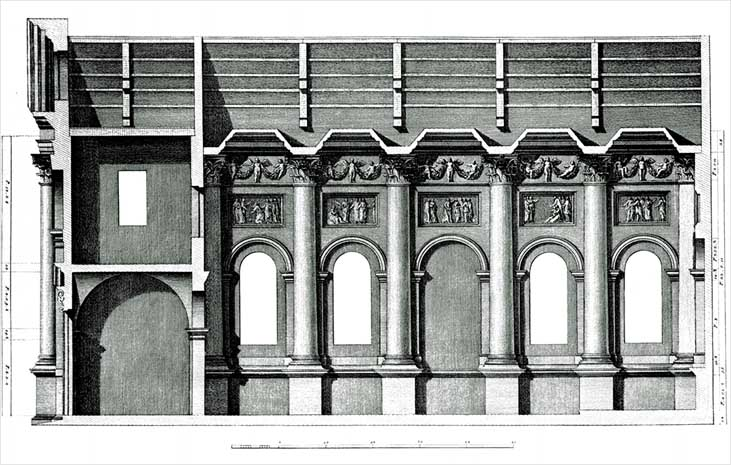
Cross section (Ottavio Bertotti Scamozzi, 1776)

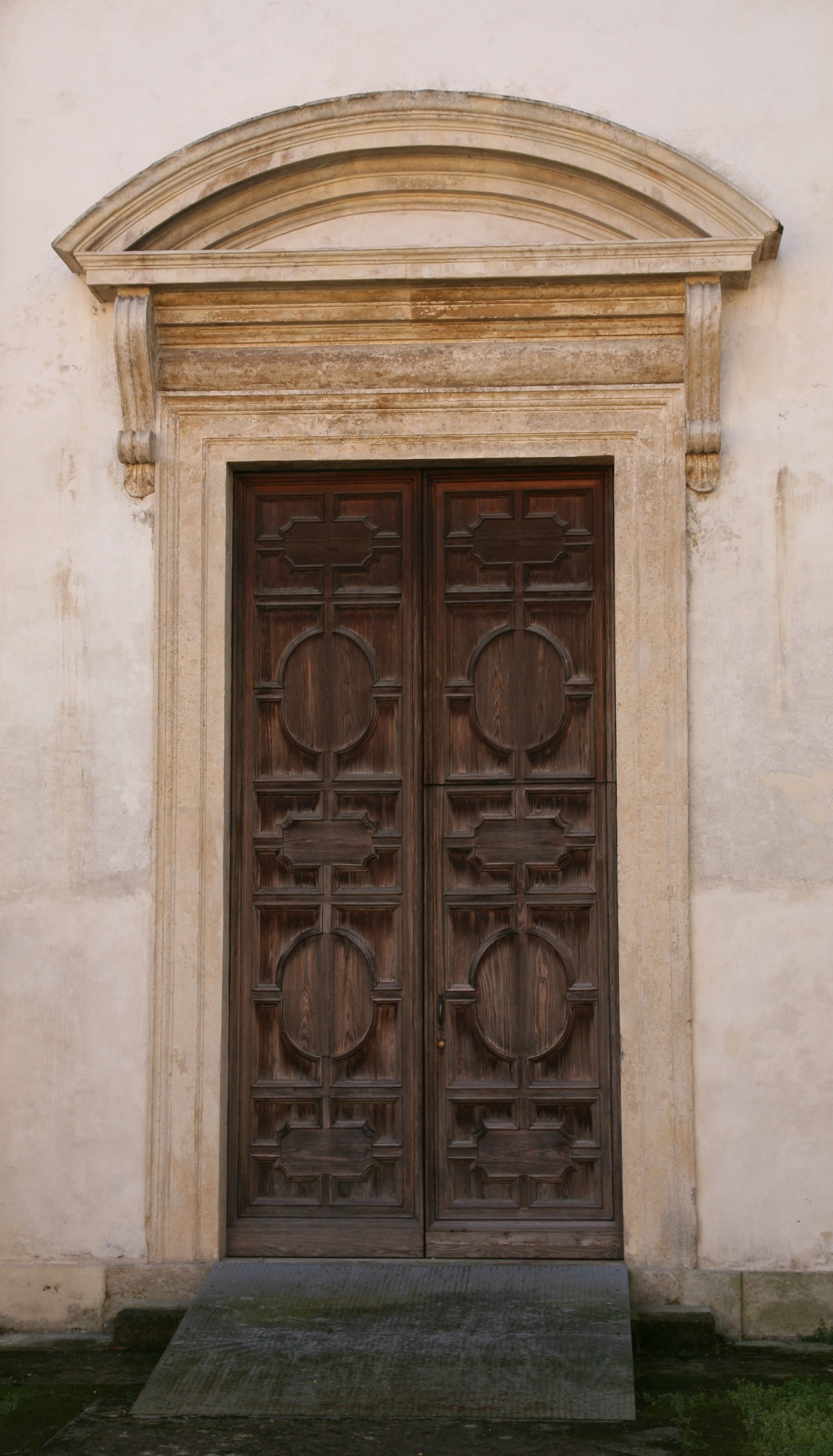
Portal
