= Arco delle Scalette =

Coordinates: 45.5410°N 11.5529°E

UNESCO World Heritage Site
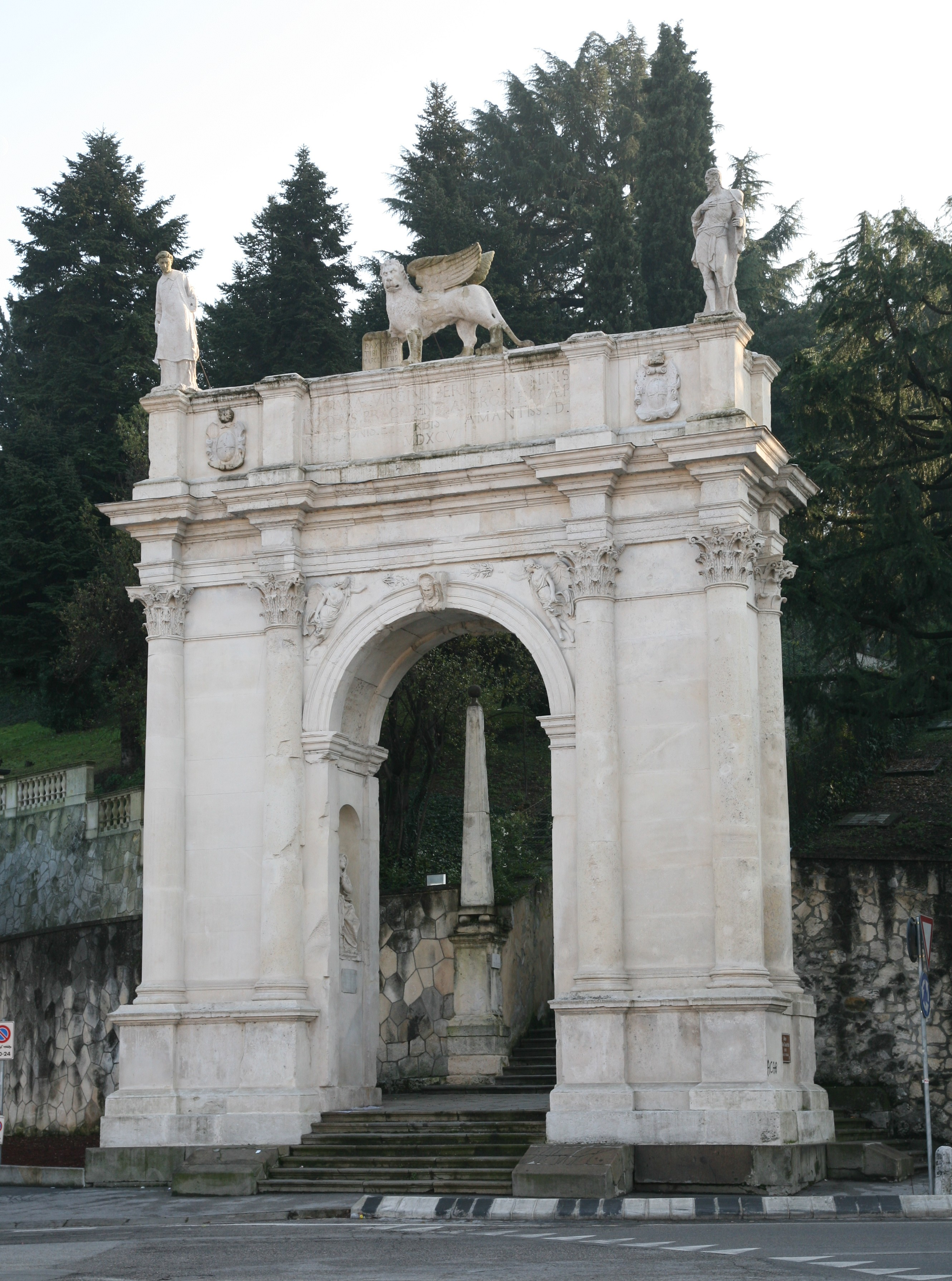

- Location within Veneto Location within Italy
- Location: Vicenza, Province of Vicenza, Veneto, Italy
- Part of: City of Vicenza and the Palladian Villas of the Veneto
- Criteria: Cultural: (i)(ii)
- Reference: 712bis-001
- Inscription: 1994 (18th Session)

The Arco delle Scalette ("arch of the little stairs") is an arch in Vicenza, built in 1596, whose design is attributed to the architect Andrea Palladio (about 1575).

Since 1994 the arch has been part of a World Heritage Site, designated to protect the Palladian buildings of Vicenza it as "City of Vicenza and the Palladian Villas of the Veneto".

Located in the south-eastern border of the historic center of the city, the arch marks the beginning of one of the routes climbing to the sanctuary of St. Mary of Monte Berico (built in the early 15th century). The path, called the "Scalette", is a series of stairs with 192 steps. That was the only point of access from the city to the sanctuary before the building of the arcades by Francesco Muttoni in the mid-18th century.

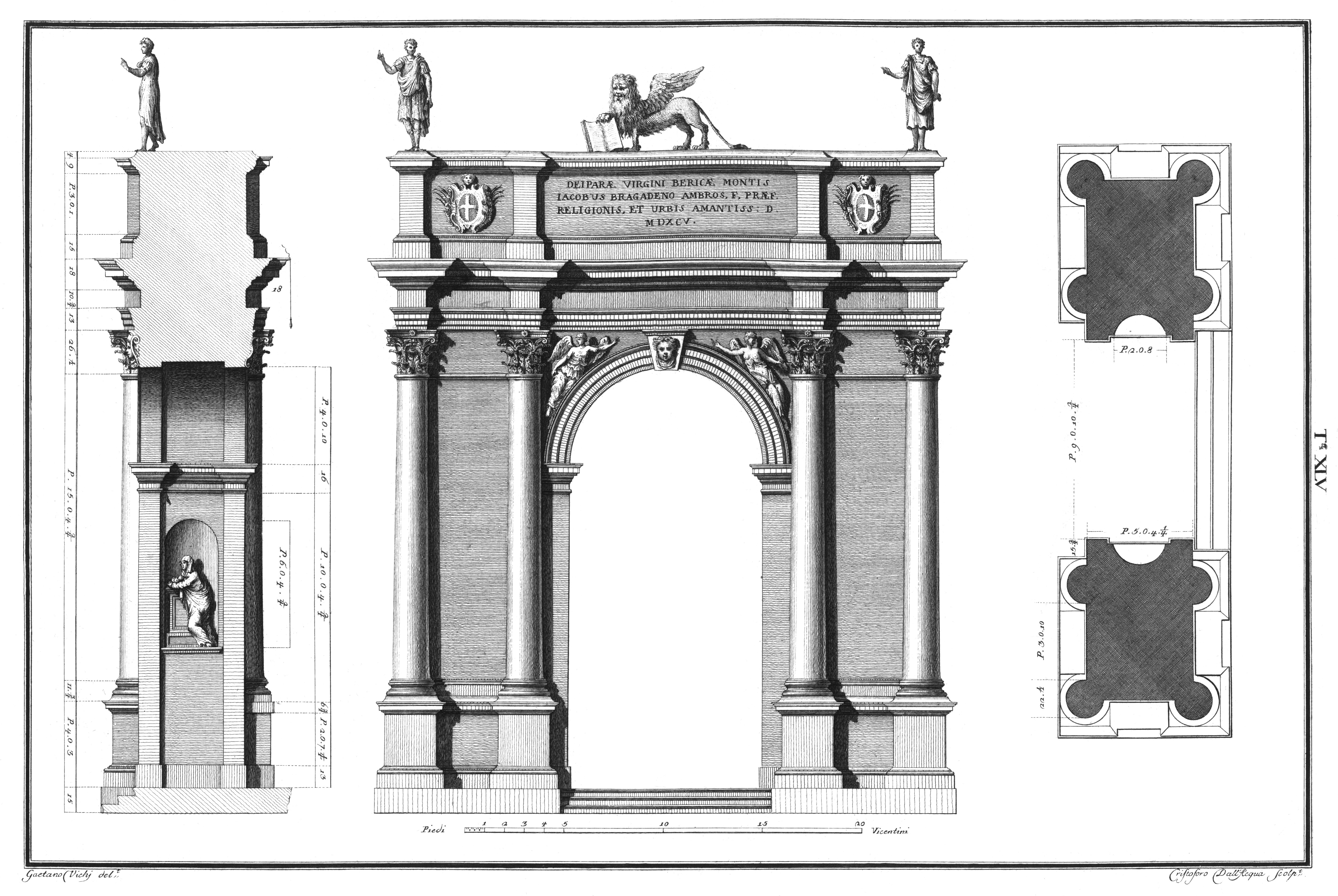
Drawing by Ottavio Bertotti Scamozzi, 1776

The origins and authenticity of the arch are unclear. The date of construction, set to 1595 (15 years after Palladio's death), is certain, like the identity of the patron, the Venetian captain Giacomo Bragadin. There are documented demands of the monks of the sanctuary, dating from 1574-1576, asking the community for financial support for the restoration of the entire path of stairs, but there is no evidence that the arch was included in the general renewal process, which involved the sanctuary itself. At the same way, the original configuration of the arch is uncertain. 17th century images shows the niches in the front of the arch, then moved in the intrados to host the statues of the Annunciation by Orazio Marinali.

== See also ==
- Monte Berico
