= Villa Arnaldi =

Building in Meledo di Sarego, Italy

Coordinates: 45.4167°N 11.4000°E

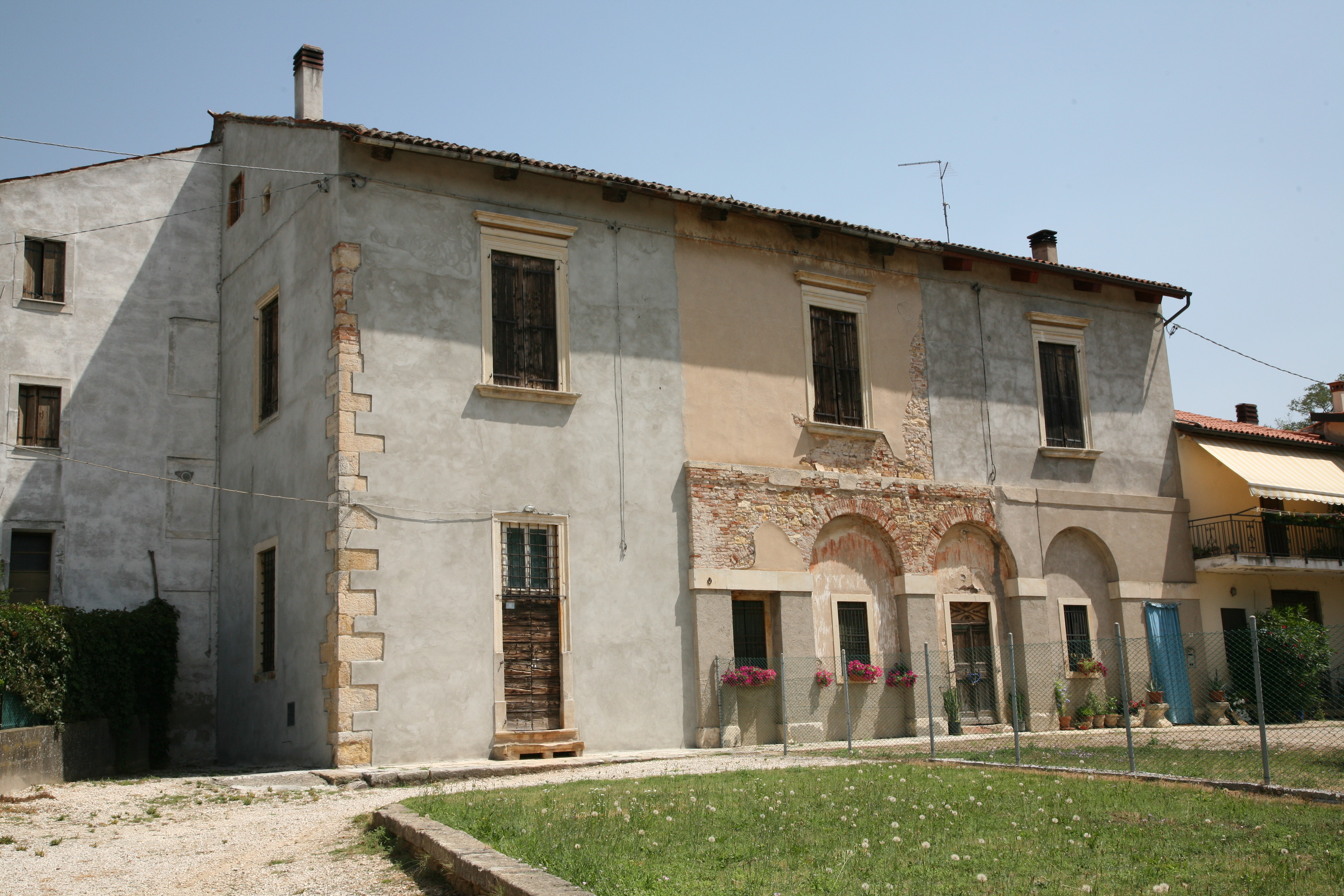
Villa Arnaldi

Villa Arnaldi is an historical edifice in Meledo di Sarego, Province of Vicenza, northern Italy, designed by Italian Renaissance architect Andrea Palladio in 1547. It remains unfinished.

The modest, incomplete Villa Arnaldi may seem like an unusual candidate for the list of Palladio's villas. It provides evidence, however, of the process usually only visible in final results, the transformation of a pre-existing building into a new architectural style. In 1547, Vincenzo Arnaldi, one of Vicenza's richest and most influential citizens, commissioned the architect Andrea Palladio to restructure the 15th century (Quattrocento) agricultural complex upon its acquisition. Arnaldi wished to improve the property in order to increase its value in a legal action with one of its previous owners. However, when Arnaldi reached an agreement in 1565, he stopped the reconstruction and simply rented it out.

A series of signed drawings allow us to follow the architect's ideas for remodelling the irregular Quattrocento complex. He proposed reconfiguring the buildings into regular shapes to define its farmyard and creating a symmetry within the spatial layout of the house. He organized the house itself around a loggia with three arches and minor, rectangular openings on its flanks (still extant though now blocked), and framed its windows with his usual mouldings.

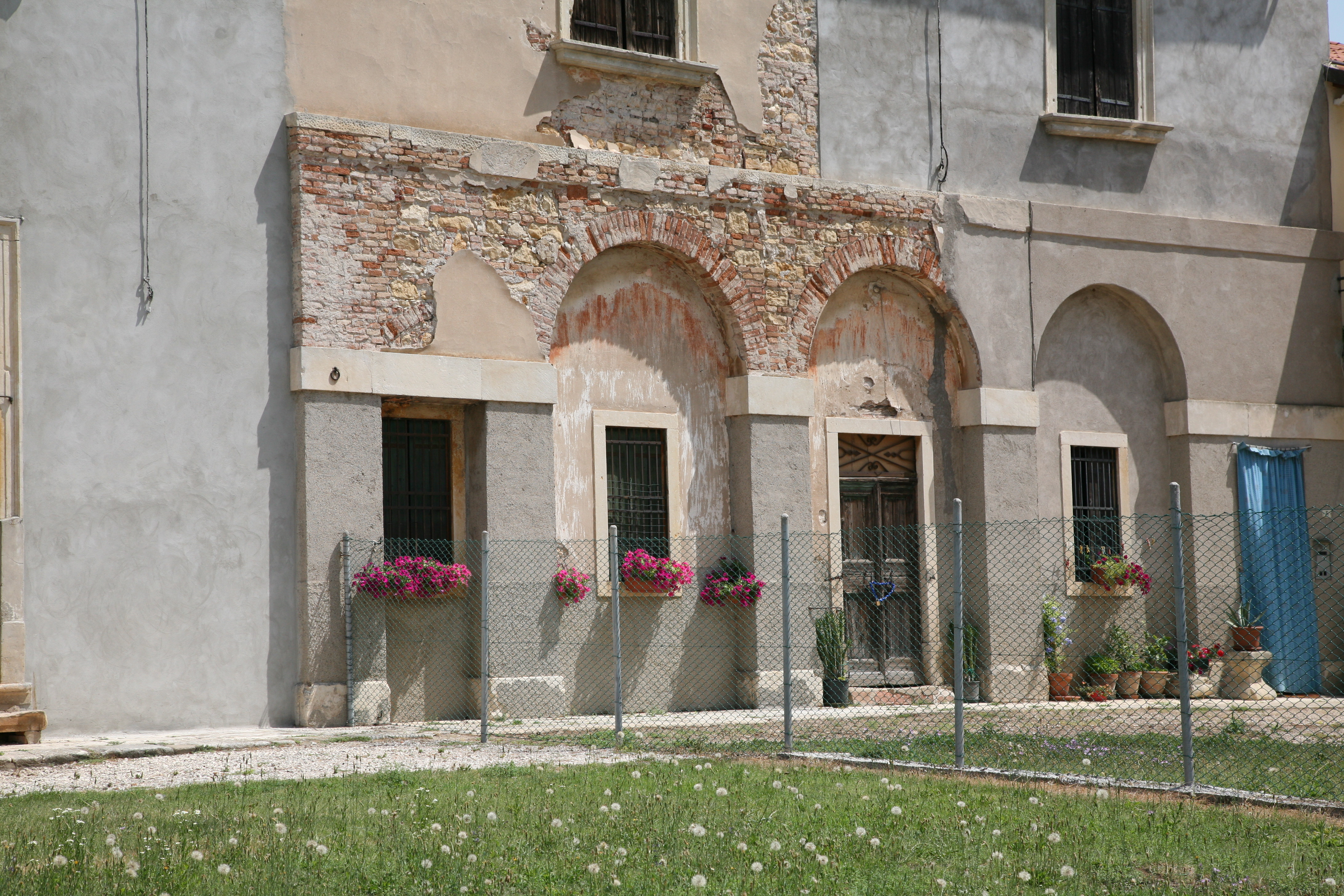
Detail of the blind arches

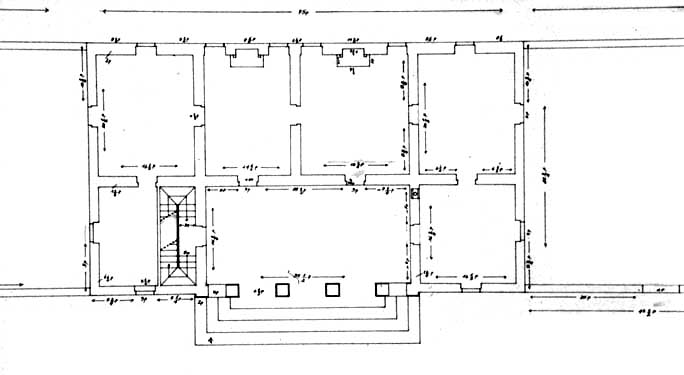
Floor plan, relief (Verlato 1998)

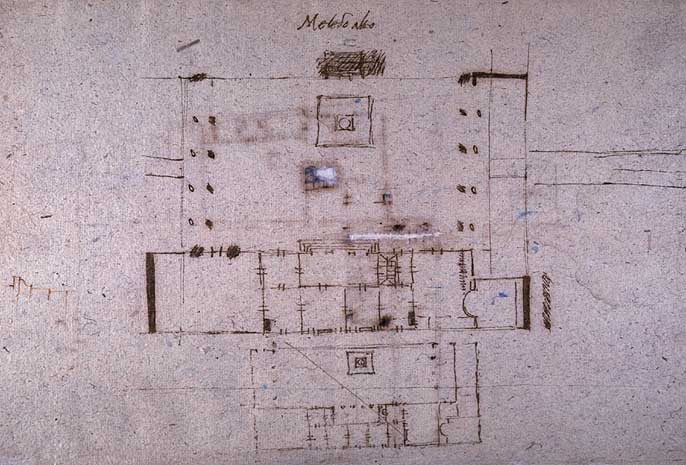
Sketch by the hand of Andrea Palladio, 1547–48. Vicenza, Biblioteca Civica Bertoliana

== See also ==
- Palladian Villas of the Veneto
- Palladian architecture
