= Gian Giorgio Trissino =

Venetian humanist, poet, dramatist, diplomat, linguist and philosopher (1478–1550)

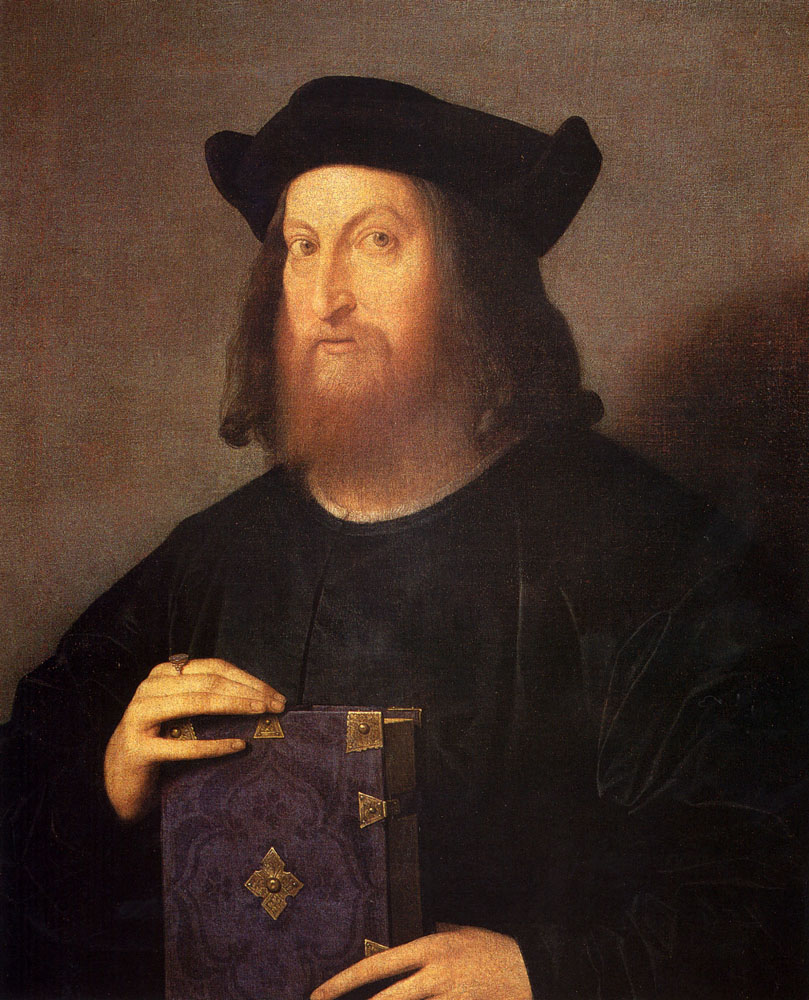
Gian Giorgio Trissino, portrayed in 1510 by Vincenzo Catena

Gian Giorgio Trissino (8 July 1478 – 8 December 1550), also called Giovan Giorgio Trissino and self-styled as Giovan Giꞷrgio Trissino, was a Venetian Renaissance humanist, poet, dramatist, diplomat, grammarian, linguist, and philosopher. He first proposed adding letters to the Italian alphabet to distinguish J from I, and V from U.

== Biography ==
Trissino was born to a patrician family in Vicenza. He sided with Holy Roman Emperor Maximilian, whose army entered Vicenza in June 1509, accompanied by members of the Vicentine nobility, including the Thiene, Chiericati, and Porto families. When Venice reconquered Vicenza on 12 November 1509, Trissino was punished for his betrayal and sent into exile. He then travelled to Germany and Lombardy and was pardoned by Venice in 1516. He eventually came under the protection of Pope Leo X, Pope Clement VII, and Pope Paul III.

He had the advantages of a good humanistic training, studying Greek under Demetrios Chalkokondyles at Milan and philosophy under Niccolò Leoniceno at Ferrara. His culture recommended him to the humanist Pope Leo X, who in 1515 sent him to Germany as his nuncio; later on Pope Clement VII showed him special favour and employed him as ambassador.

In 1532, the Emperor Charles V made Trissino a count palatine. In spite of the banishment from Vicenza pronounced upon him in 1509 because his family had favoured the plans of Maximilian, he was held in high esteem throughout Italy. Wherever he made his home, it was a centre for gatherings of scholars, littérateurs, and the most cultured men of the time. His family life was far from happy, apparently through little fault of his own.

From 1538 to 1540, Trissino returned to his studies at the University of Padua with an abiding interest in Plato and the question of free will.

In the history of modern European literature, Trissino occupies a prominent place because of his tragedy Sophonisba (c. 1515; published 1524). Based on the life of the Carthaginian lady Sophonisba and inspired by ancient tragedies, it was perhaps the first tragedy in early modern times to show deference to the classic rules. It served as an example for European tragedies throughout the 16th century. It was translated into French by Mellin de Saint-Gelais, and was performed with great acclaim in 1556 at the Château de Blois.

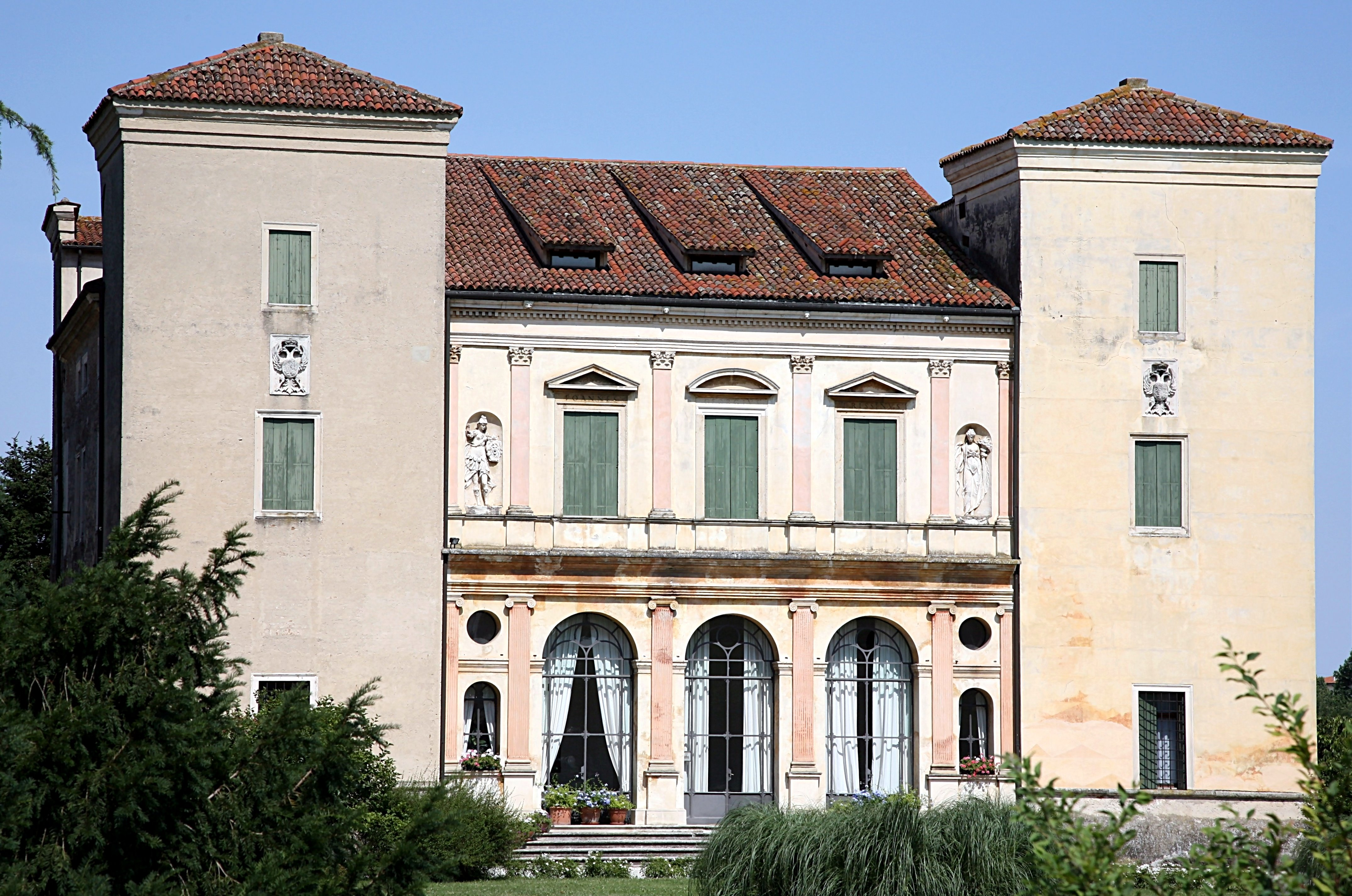
Villa Trissino in Cricoli

A partisan of Aristotelian regularity, Trissino disapproved of the freedom of the chivalrous epic, as written by Ariosto. In his own composition, l'Italia liberata dai Goti (1547–1548), dealing with the campaigns of Belisarius in Italy, he sought to show that it was possible to write in the vernacular an epic in accordance with the classic precepts. The result is a cold and colourless composition. Moreover, as Nicholas Birns points out, the very choice of the Byzantine-Ostrogothic wars of the sixth century as a subject committed Trissino to dealing with barbarian subjects with which, as an extreme classicist, he felt little affinity.

In addition, Trissino played a prominent role in the early career of Andrea Palladio, which developed into a long and close friendship between the two men. Trissino first took Palladio under his wing after becoming acquainted with him while building his villa in Cricoli.

Trissino died in Rome in December 1550.

An edition of his collected works was published at Verona in 1729.

=== Linguistics ===
His endeavours in the field of linguistics received lively reactions in the literary world of the time. Following the lead of Dante, he advocated the enrichment of the Italian language, and espoused in his Castellano (1529) the theory that the language is a courtly one made up of contributions from the refined centres in Italy; instead of being fundamentally of Tuscan origin. His theory was supported by the publication, also in 1529, of his translation of Dante's De vulgari eloquentia, which Trissino had saved from oblivion.

Heated discussions followed his 1524 essay titled Ɛpistola del Trissino de le lettere nuꞷvamente aggiunte ne la lingua Italiana, in which he proposed to reform Italian orthography by adding the following letters to distinguish sounds of the spoken language:

| New letter | | | Distinct from | | | Note |
| Symbol | Sound description | IPA | Symbol | Sound description | IPA | Note |
|---|---|---|---|---|---|---|
| Ɛ ɛ | open E | [ɛ] | E e | closed E | [e] | Derivative of Greek epsilon. The minuscule has become IPA standard, and this letter is nowadays used in some African languages such as Ewe and Kabiye. |
| Ꞷ ꞷ | open O | [ɔ] | O o | closed O | [o] | Derivative of Greek omega. Did not become widely accepted, but stylized in Trissino's own name. |
| U u | vocalic U | [u] | V v | consonantal V | [v] | Commonly used. In lowercase, at that time, usually "v" was used for both. |
| J j | consonantal J | [j] | I i | vocalic I | [i] | Used in many orthographies and in IPA. |
| Ꝣ ꝣ | voiced Z | [dz] | Z z | unvoiced Z | [ts] | Early form of what later became c-cedilla ⟨Ç ç⟩. Trissino intentionally reversed the use of voice and unvoiced (compared to Spanish), because "it appeared to be the lesser innovation". |

The idea was taken up for ⟨j⟩ and ⟨u⟩, which brought to the modern distinction ⟨V⟩ vs. ⟨U⟩ and ⟨I⟩ vs. ⟨J⟩. Other European languages eventually adopted these new letters and distinctions in their orthographies, before it was largely abandoned in contemporary Italian, which generally spells the sound [j] with an ⟨I⟩.

Later proposals reversed the ⟨ꞷ⟩ vs. ⟨o⟩ assignations. Following Claudio Tolomei, Trissino used ⟨ʃ⟩ for the voiced ⟨s⟩ ([z]), ⟨ki⟩ instead of ⟨chi⟩ as in kiave, ⟨lj⟩ instead of ⟨gli⟩ as in volja and ⟨ʃc⟩ for ⟨sc⟩ as in laʃcia.

Because he applied his system to his publications of the Ɛpistola, the Sofonisba and Il Castellano, his research also serves as a valuable source for the differences between the Tuscan pronunciation and that of the courtly language, which he advocated as an enrichment of the Italian language.

Trissino's ideas about a synthetic Italian standard were opposed by two major factions. On the one side were those, like Machiavelli, who supported the spoken version of the Tuscan dialect. On the other hand, Pietro Bembo argued that the Italian standard should be based on the language of the Florentine classics of the 14th century, especially Petrarch and Boccaccio (Dante's language was considered too unpolished). By the end of the century, Bembo's position prevailed, and Trissino's ideas were rejected.

=== Other literary works ===
I Simillimi (1548), which is a version of the Menæchmi of Plautus, I Ritratti (1524), which is a composite portrait of feminine beauty, and the Poetica, which contains his summing up of the Aristotelian principles of literary composition, comprise the rest of his important writings.

== See also ==
- Trissino family
- Marguerite de Cambis, translator of Trissino
