= Marguerite de Cambis =

French noblewoman and translator (fl. 1550s)

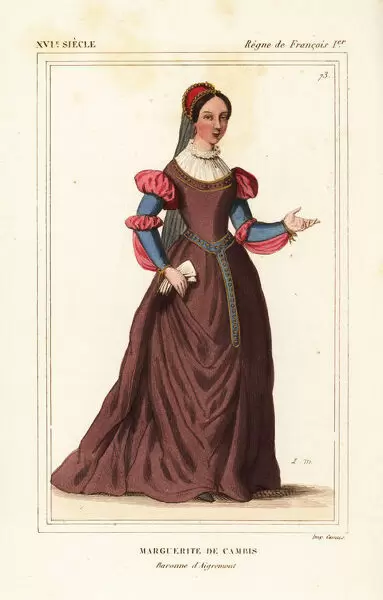
- Born: Alès, Languedoc, France
- Occupations: Writer and translator
- Spouse(s): Pons d’Alairac, Baron d'Aigremont (m. 1545, d. 1550); Jacques de Rochemore (m. 1551)
- Writing career
- Years active: fl. 1550s

Marguerite de Cambis, Baroness d'Aigremont (fl. 1550s), was a sixteenth century French noblewoman and translator. She translated the works of Gian Giorgio Trissino and Giovanni Boccaccio from Italian into French.

== Family ==
Cambis was born in Alès, near Nîmes, in the province of Languedoc, France, to Louis de Cambis, Governor of Alès, and Marguerite de Pluviers. She was the youngest of their six children. The Cambis family were Tuscan bankers who had emigrated to Avignon in 1448 for political reasons. Her father became a servant of King Louis XII and was rewarded with the title of Baron of Alès.

Cambis married firstly in 1545 to Pons d’Alairac, Baron d'Aigremont, and was widowed in 1550. A year later she married Jacques de Rochemore, a doctor of law and translator from Nîmes. She lived with her second husband at the Château d'Aigremont and they shared a love of literature and music.

A contemporary translator named Ménard wrote of Cambis that: "this noble soul, through her wit and intellect, brought honor and glory to her sex."

Her dates of birth and death are unknown.

== Translations ==
Cambis translated works of Gian Giorgio Trissino and Giovanni Boccaccio from Italian into French:

- Epistre du Seigneur Jean Trissin de la vie que doit tenir une Dame veuve (Epistle by Lord Jean Trissi on the Conduct That a Widow Should Have), 1554.
- Epistre consolatoire de messire Jean Boccace, envoyee au Signeur Pino de Rossi (Consolatory Epistle by Boccaccio to Lord Pino Rossi), 1556. This translation was first published by Lyon bookseller and printer Guillaume Rouillé.

Cambis' translations were unconventionally into the vernacular French rather than into Latin.
