= Palazzo Barbaran da Porto =

UNESCO World Heritage Site
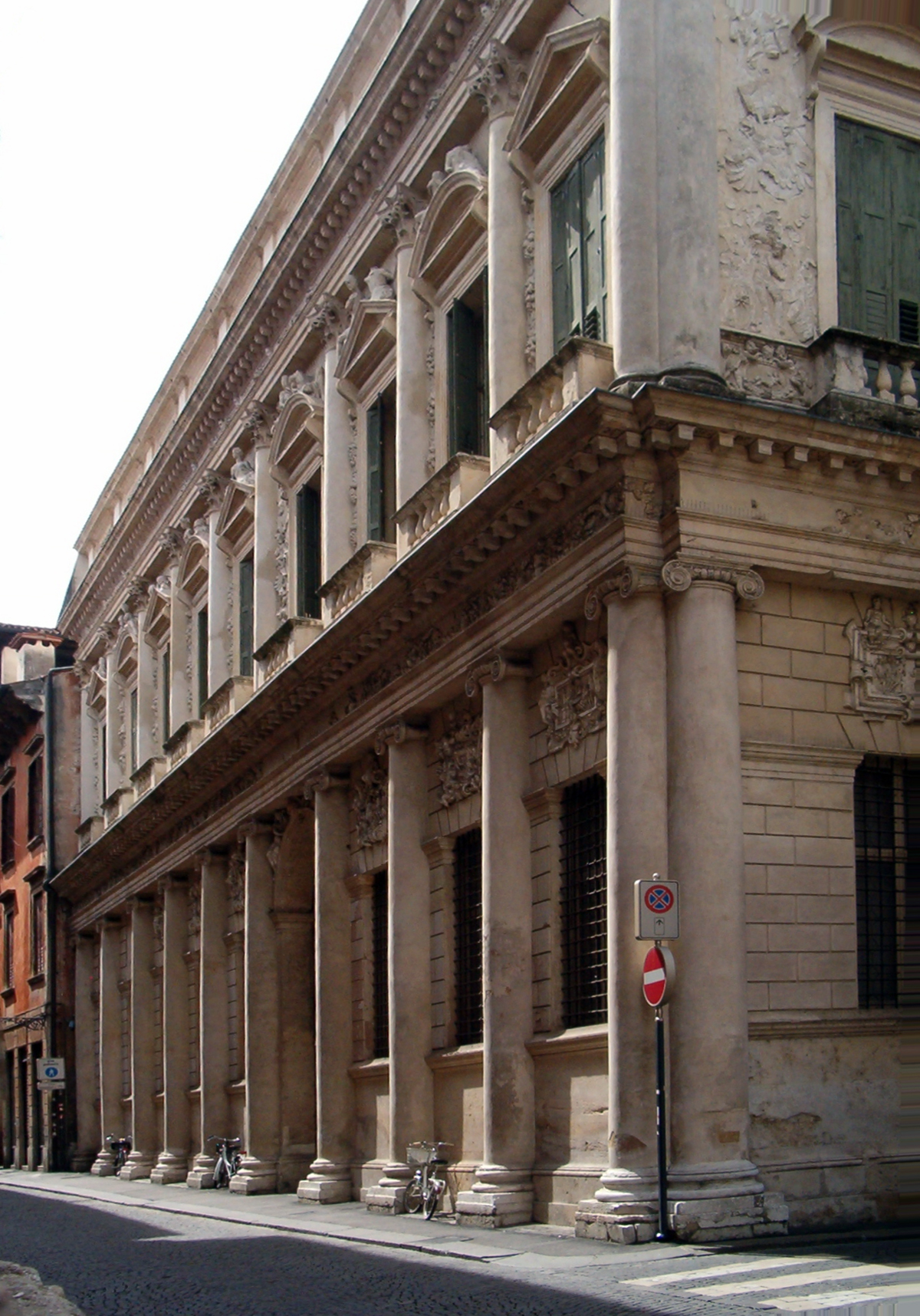

- Location within Veneto Location within Italy
- Location: Vicenza, Veneto, Italy
- Part of: City of Vicenza and the Palladian Villas of the Veneto
- Criteria: Cultural: (i)(ii)
- Reference: 712bis-001
- Inscription: 1994 (18th Session)
- Website: Official website
- Coordinates: 45°32′55″N 11°32′44″E

Palazzo Barbaran da Porto is a palazzo in Vicenza, Italy designed in 1569 and built between 1570 and 1575 by Italian Renaissance architect Andrea Palladio.

Since 1994 the palace is part of the "City of Vicenza and the Palladian Villas of the Veneto" World Heritage Site by UNESCO.

In the palace is located the Palladio Museum and the Centro Internazionale di Studi di Architettura Andrea Palladio (CISA).

== History ==
The sumptuous residence realised between 1570 and 1575 for the Vicentine noble Montano Barbarano is the only great city palace that Andrea Palladio succeeded in executing in its entirety.

In his History of Vicenza of 1591, Iacopo Marzari records Montano Barbarano as a man "of belles lettres and most excellent musician". Various flutes figure in the 1592 inventory of the palace, confirming the existence of an intensive musical activity there.

At least three different autograph projects survive, preserved in London, which document alternative hypotheses for the building's plan, all quite different from the actual one and testimony to a complex design process. Barbarano, in fact, requested Palladio to respect the existence of various houses belonging to the family and already existing on the area of the new palace. Moreover, once the project was finalised Barbarano acquired a further house adjoining the property, which resulted in the asymmetrical positioning of the entrance portal. In any case, the constraints imposed by the site and by a practical patron became the occasion for courageous and refined solutions: Palladio's intervention is magisterial, elaborating upon a sophisticated project for "restructuring" which blended the diverse pre-existing structures into a unified edifice.

In 1998, after a twenty-year restoration, the Palace has been opened to the public. The exhibition activities began in March 1999.

== Description ==
On the ground floor, a magnificent four-columned atrium welds together the two pre-existing building lots. In realising the scheme, Palladio was called upon to resolve two problems: one statical, how to support the floor of the great hall on the piano nobile; the other compositional, how to restore a symmetrical appearance to interiors compromised by the oblique course of the perimeter walls from the pre-existing houses.

Departing from the model of the wings of the Theatre of Marcellus in Rome, Palladio divided the interior into three aisles, placing centrally four Ionic columns which allowed the reduction of the span of the central cross-vaults, set against lateral barrel vaults. He thus achieved a very statically efficient framework capable of bearing the floor of the hall above without any difficulty. The central columns were then tied to the perimeter walls by fragments of rectilinear entablature, which absorb the irregularities of the atrium plan: in this way he realised a sort of system of serliane, a stratagem conceptually similar to that of the Basilica Palladiana loggias. Palladio even adopted the unusual type of Ionic capital (derived from the Temple of Saturn in the Forum Romanum) because it permitted him to mask the slight but significant rotations necessary to align the columns and engaged columns.

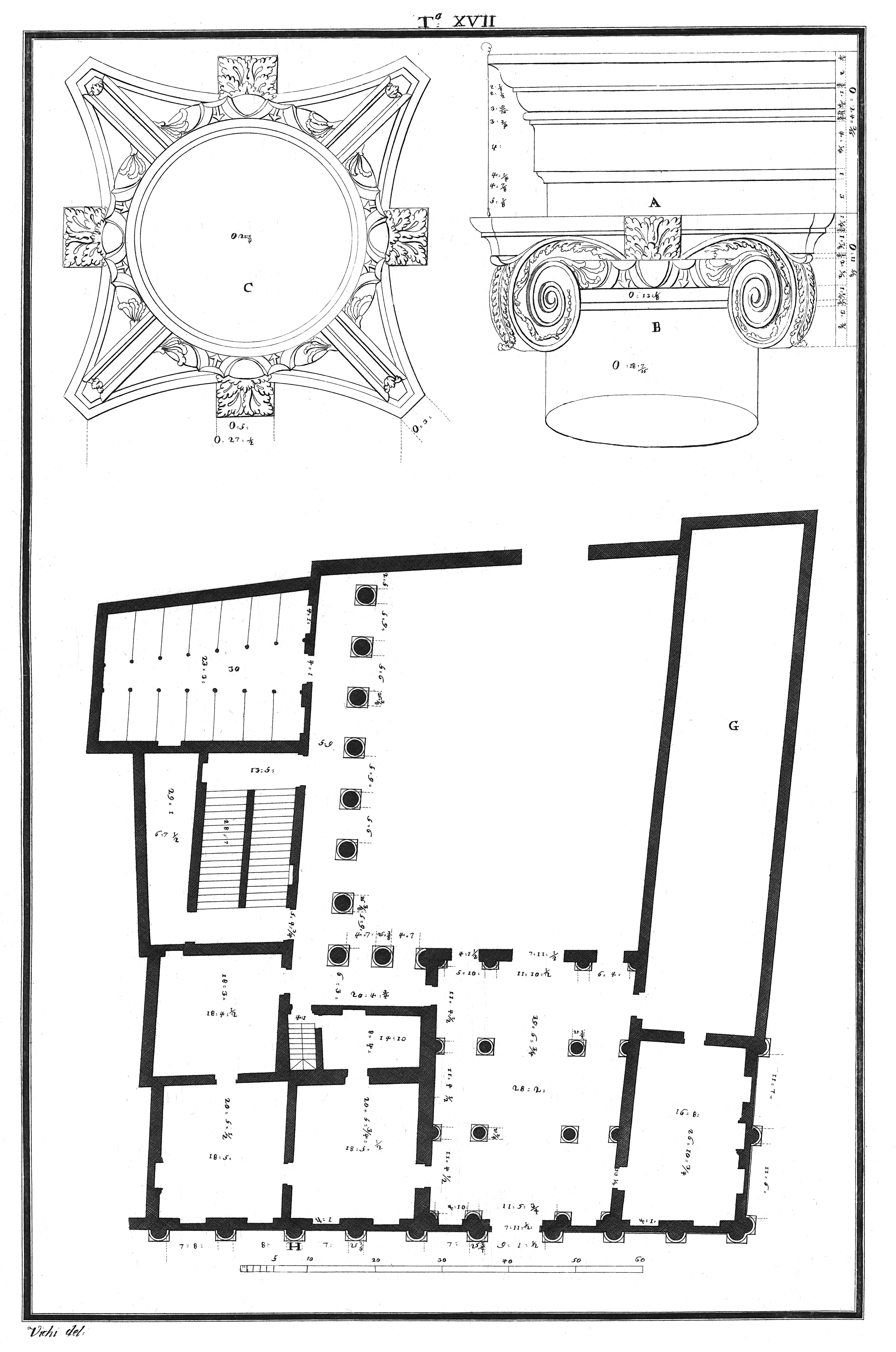
Floor plan and relief of an Ionic capital (drawing by Ottavio Bertotti Scamozzi, 1776)

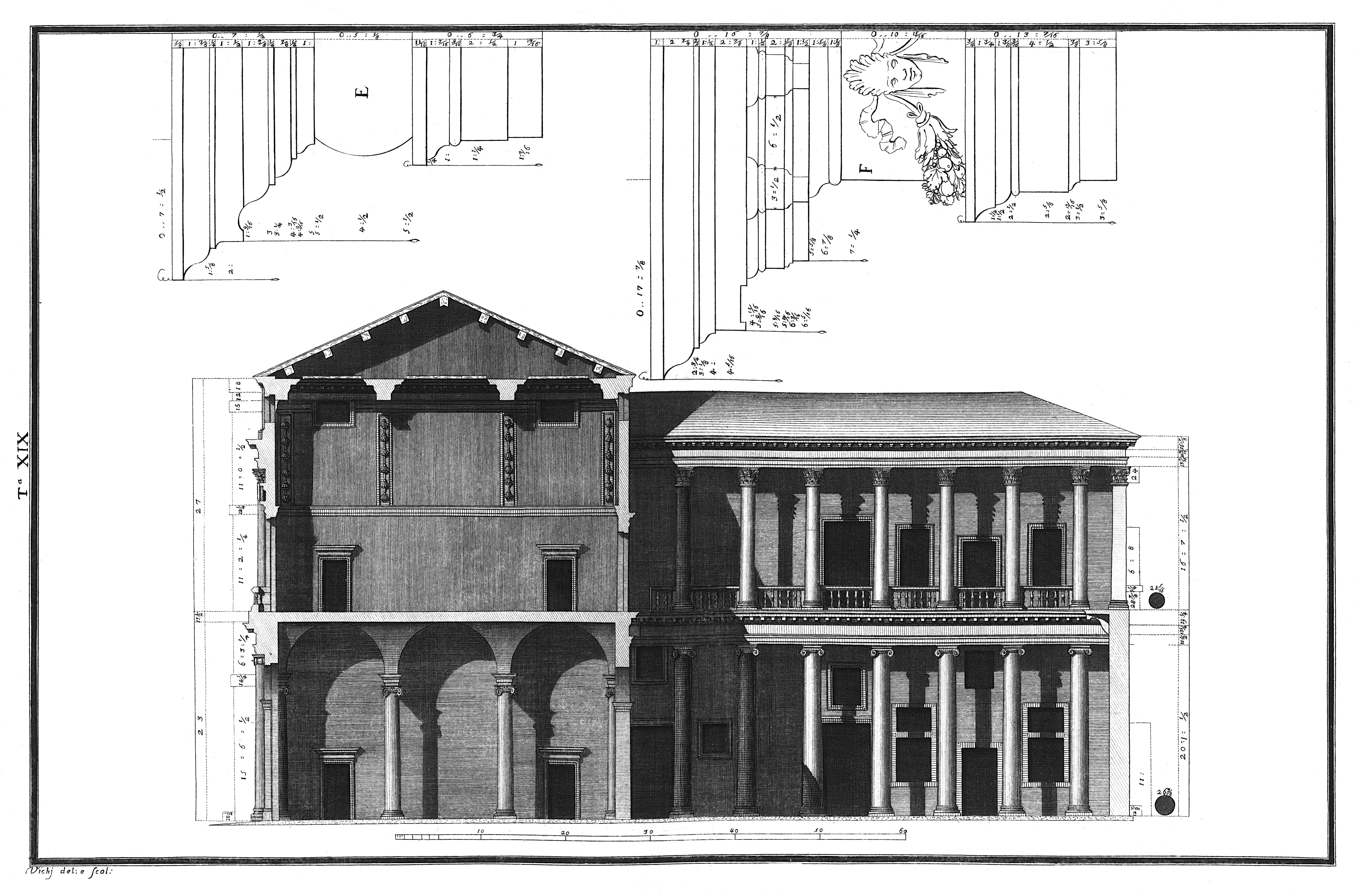
Cross section (Ottavio Bertotti Scamozzi, 1776)

== Decoration ==
To decorate the palace, in several campaigns Montano employed some of the greatest artists of his time: Giovanni Battista Zelotti (who had already intervened in the interiors of Palladio's Villa Emo at Fanzolo), Anselmo Canera and Andrea Vicentino; the stuccoes were entrusted to Lorenzo Rubini (who contemporaneously executed the external decorations of the Loggia del Capitanio) and, after his death in 1574, to his son [Agostino. The net result was a sumptuous palace capable of rivalling the residences of the Thiene, the Porto and of the Valmarana, a palace which permitted its patron to represent himself to the city as a ranking member of the Vicentine cultural élite.

== Gallery ==
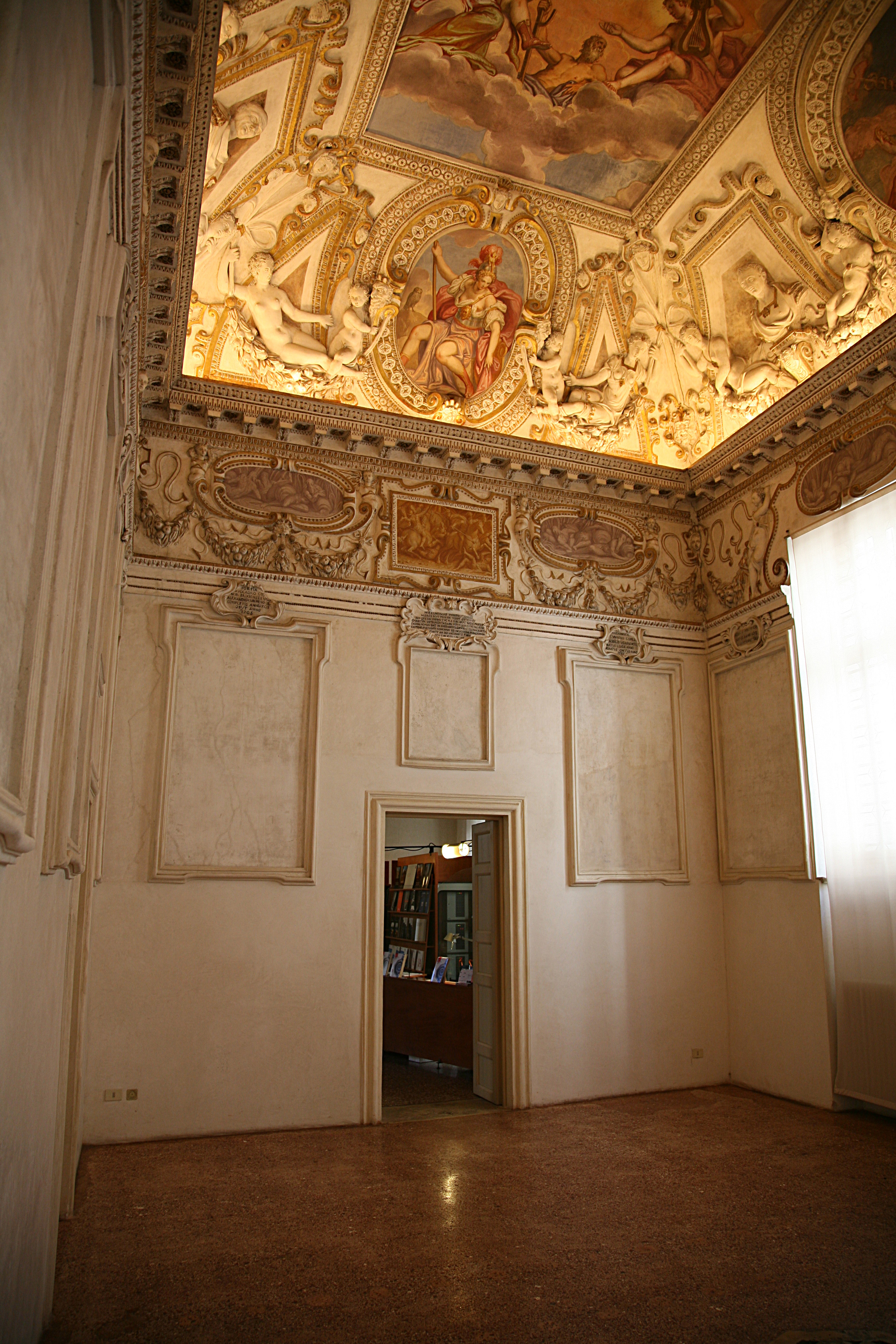
Decoration of the interiors

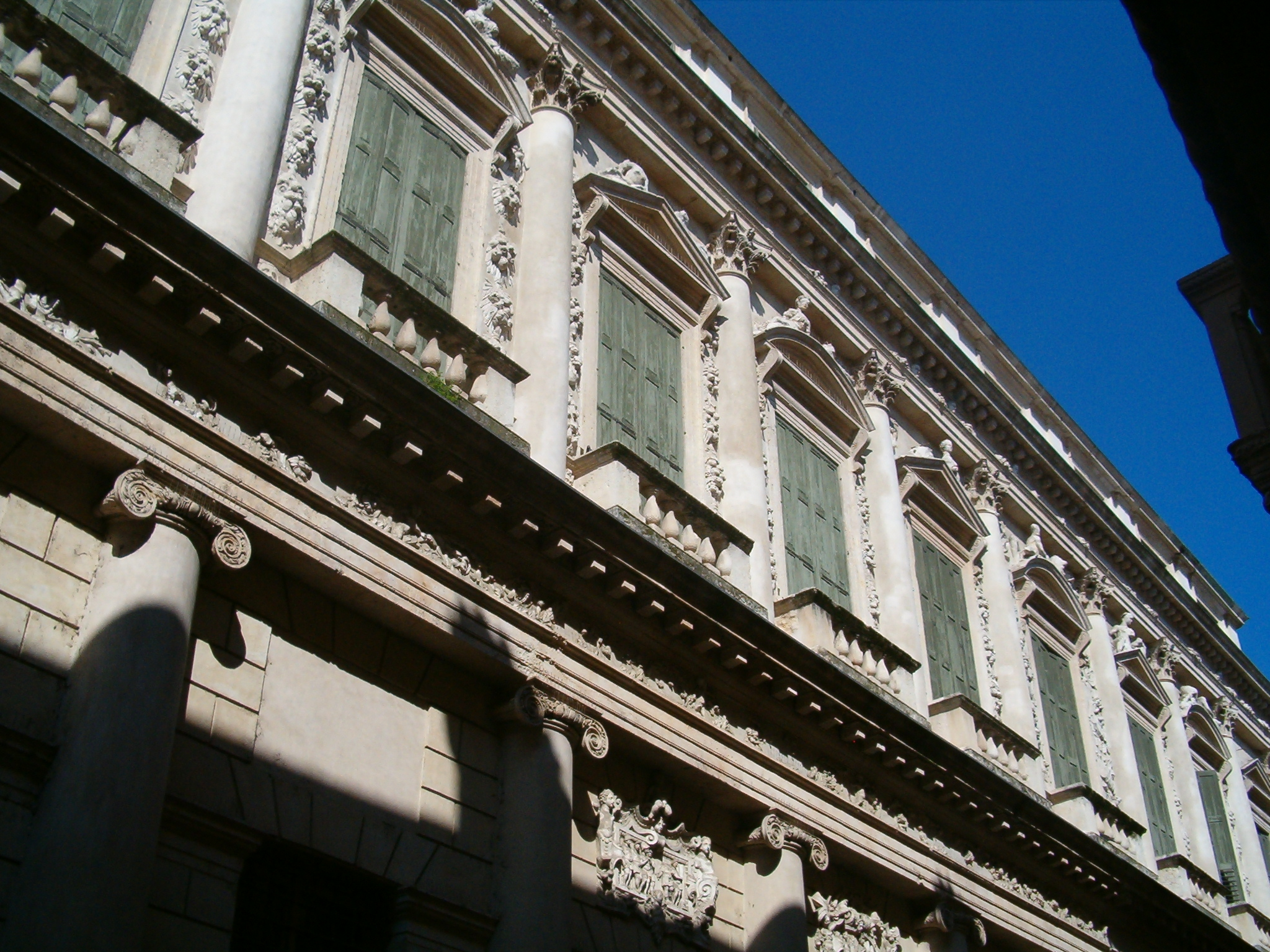
Façade detail

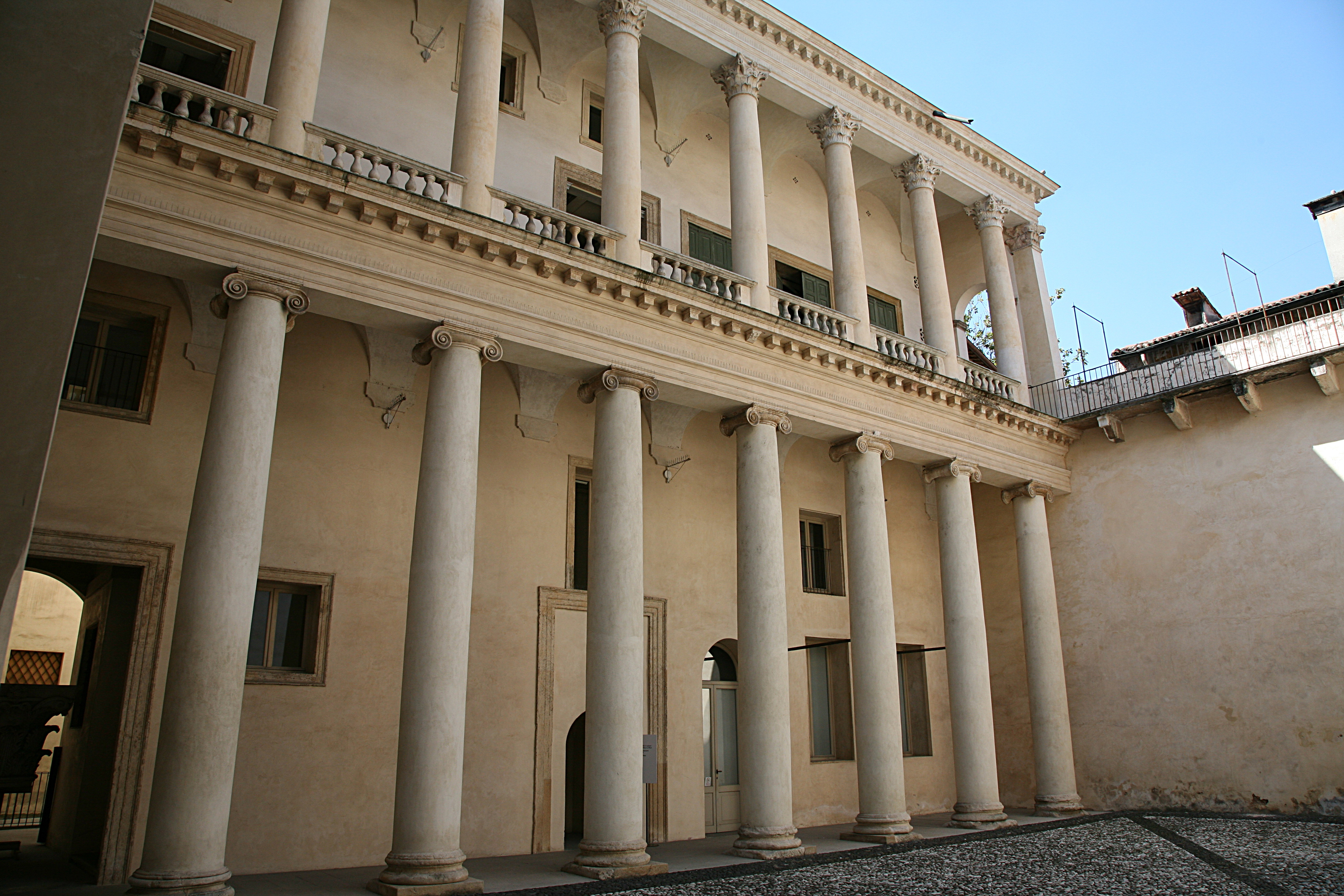
Loggia in the courtyard

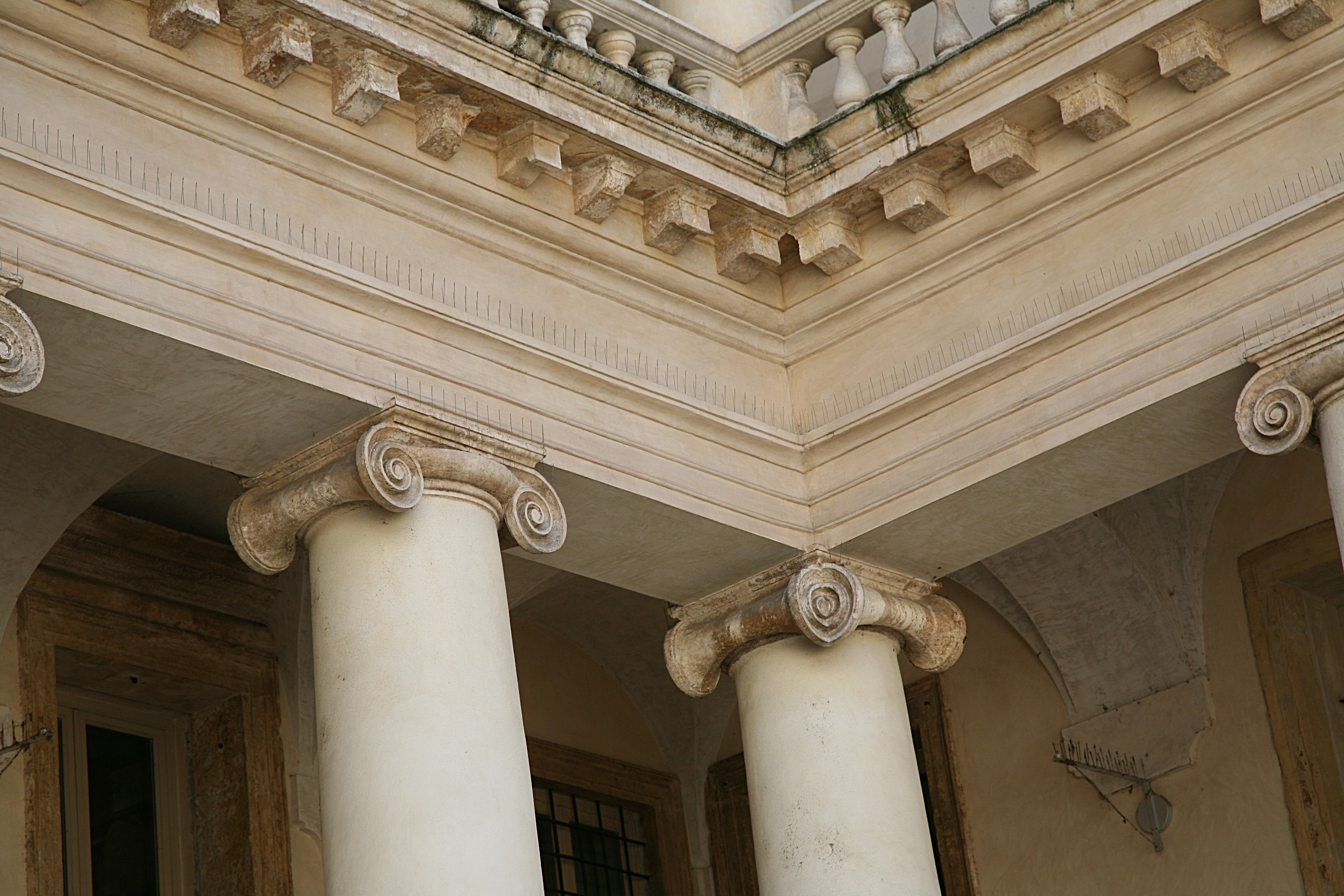
Details with Ionic capitals
