= Villa Trissino (Cricoli) =

Coordinates: 45°33′55″N 11°32′49″E

UNESCO World Heritage Site
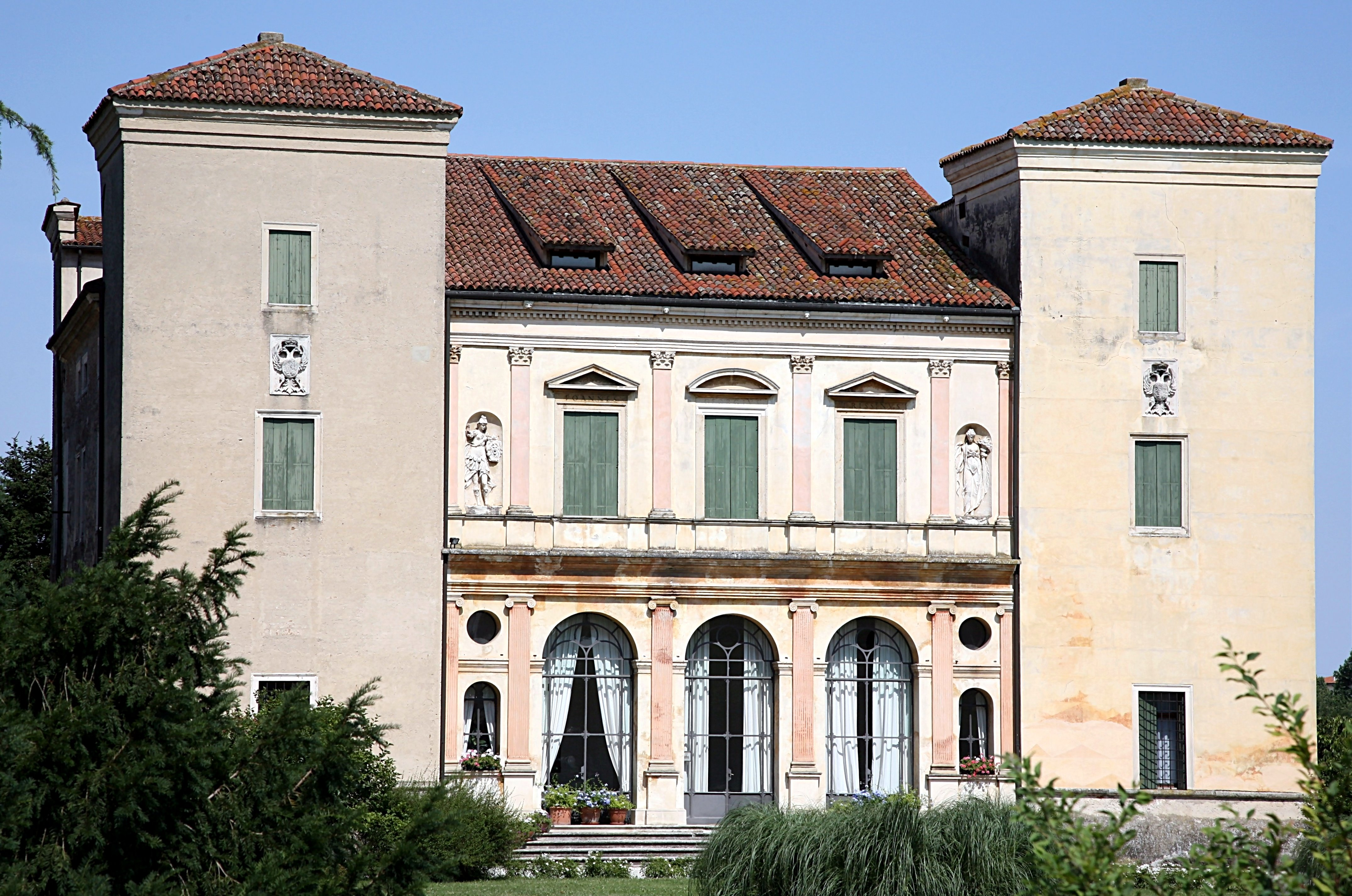

- Location within Veneto Location within Italy
- Location: Vicenza, Province of Vicenza, Veneto, Italy
- Part of: City of Vicenza and the Palladian Villas of the Veneto
- Criteria: Cultural: (i)(ii)
- Reference: 712bis-001
- Inscription: 1994 (18th Session)
- Extensions: 1996

The Villa Trissino is a patrician villa, which belonged to Gian Giorgio Trissino, located at Cricoli, just outside the center of Vicenza, in northern Italy. It was mainly built in the 16th century and is associated by tradition with the architect Andrea Palladio.

Since 1994 the villa has been part of a World Heritage Site, designated to protect the Palladian buildings of Vicenza. In 1996 UNESCO extended the site "Vicenza, City of Palladio" to cover the Palladian Villas outside the core area and renamed it as "City of Vicenza and the Palladian Villas of the Veneto".

This villa is not to be confused with the similarly named Villa Trissino some 20 km away at Sarego, an incomplete building that Palladio designed for Ludovico and Francesco Trissino, as documented in I quattro libri dell'architettura ("The Four Books of Architecture").

== History ==
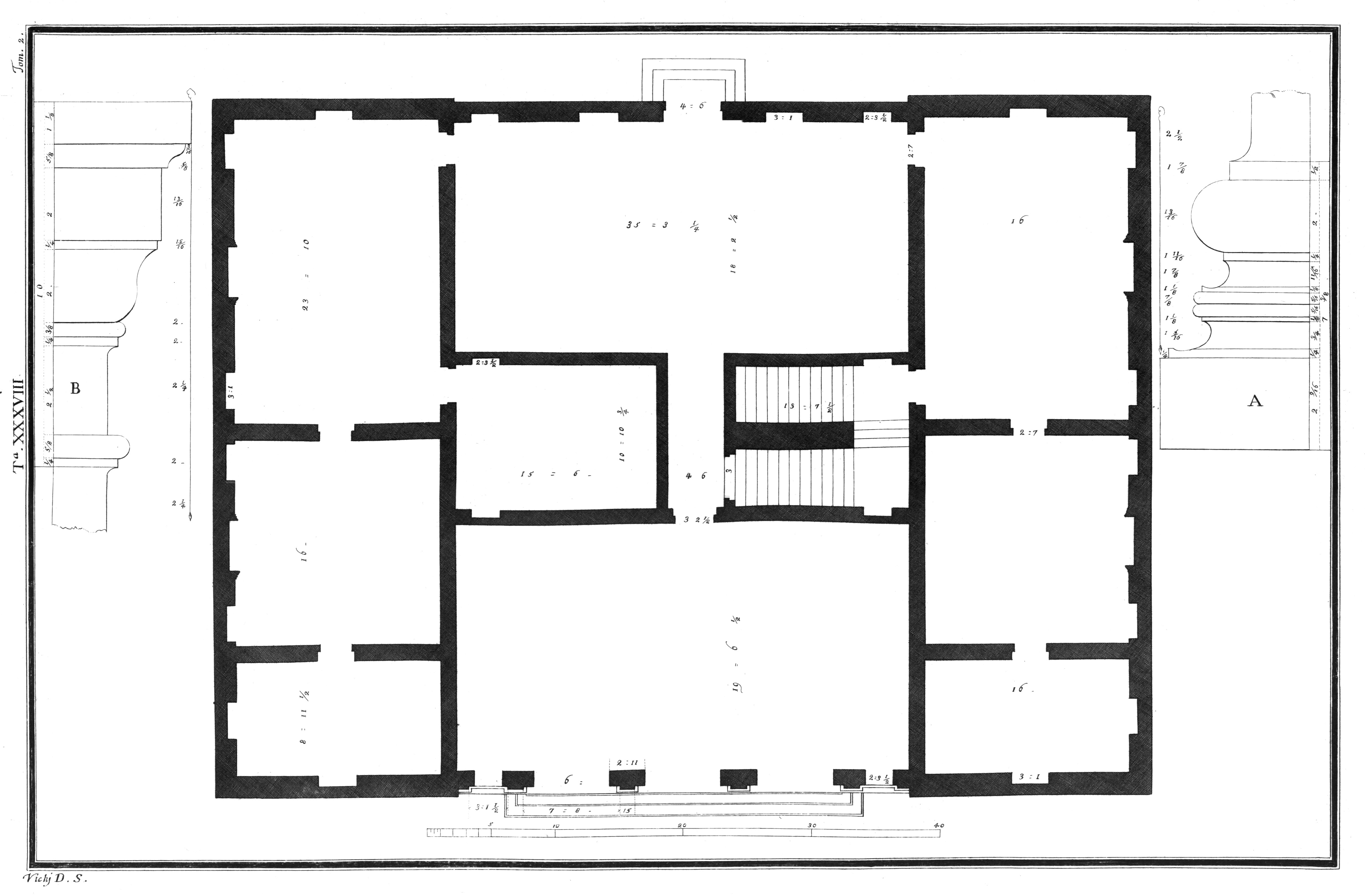
Floor plan and details (Ottavio Bertotti Scamozzi, 1778)

It is uncertain whether this villa was designed by Palladio, but it is one of the centres if not, in fact, the origin of his myth. For, tradition holds that right here, in the second half of the 1530s, the Vicentine noble Giangiorgio Trissino (1478–1550) met the young mason Andrea di Pietro at work on the building of his villa. Somehow intuiting the youth’s potential and talent, Trissino took charge of his future formation, introduced him into the Vicentine aristocracy and, in the space of a few years, transformed him into the architect who bore the aulic name of Palladio.

Giangiorgio Trissino was a man of letters, the author of plays for the theatre and works on grammar. In Rome he had been received into the restricted cultural circle of Pope Leo X Medici, where he had met Raphael. An able connoisseur of architecture (his drawings for his own city palace and the draft of a treatise on architecture still survive), he was probably personally responsible for the remodelling of the family villa at Cricoli, just outside Vicenza, which he had inherited from his father.

Trissino did not demolish the pre-existing building, but redesigned it to give priority to the principal facade facing south. This gesture was a sort of manifesto of membership in the new constructional culture based on the rediscovery of ancient Roman architecture. Between the two existing towers Trissino inserted a two-storey, arcaded loggia, which was directly inspired by Raphael’s facade of the Villa Madama in Rome, as published by Sebastiano Serlio in the Terzo lLibro dell’architettura (published in Venice in 1540). Trissino reorganised the spaces into a sequence of lateral rooms, which differ in dimensions but are linked by a system of inter-related proportions (1:1; 2:3; 1:2), a matrix which would become a key theme in Palladio’s design method.

Building works were certainly concluded by 1538. At the end of the eighteenth century, the Vicentine architect Ottone Calderari heavily modified the structure, and in the first years of the twentieth century a second campaign of works cancelled out the last traces of the Gothic building.

== See also ==
- Palladian Villas of the Veneto
- Palladian architecture

== Sources ==
(in English and Italian) Centro Internazionali di Studi di Architettura Andrea Palladio (with kind permission).
