= Villa Trissino (Meledo di Sarego) =

Coordinates: 45°25′42″N 11°24′49″E

UNESCO World Heritage Site
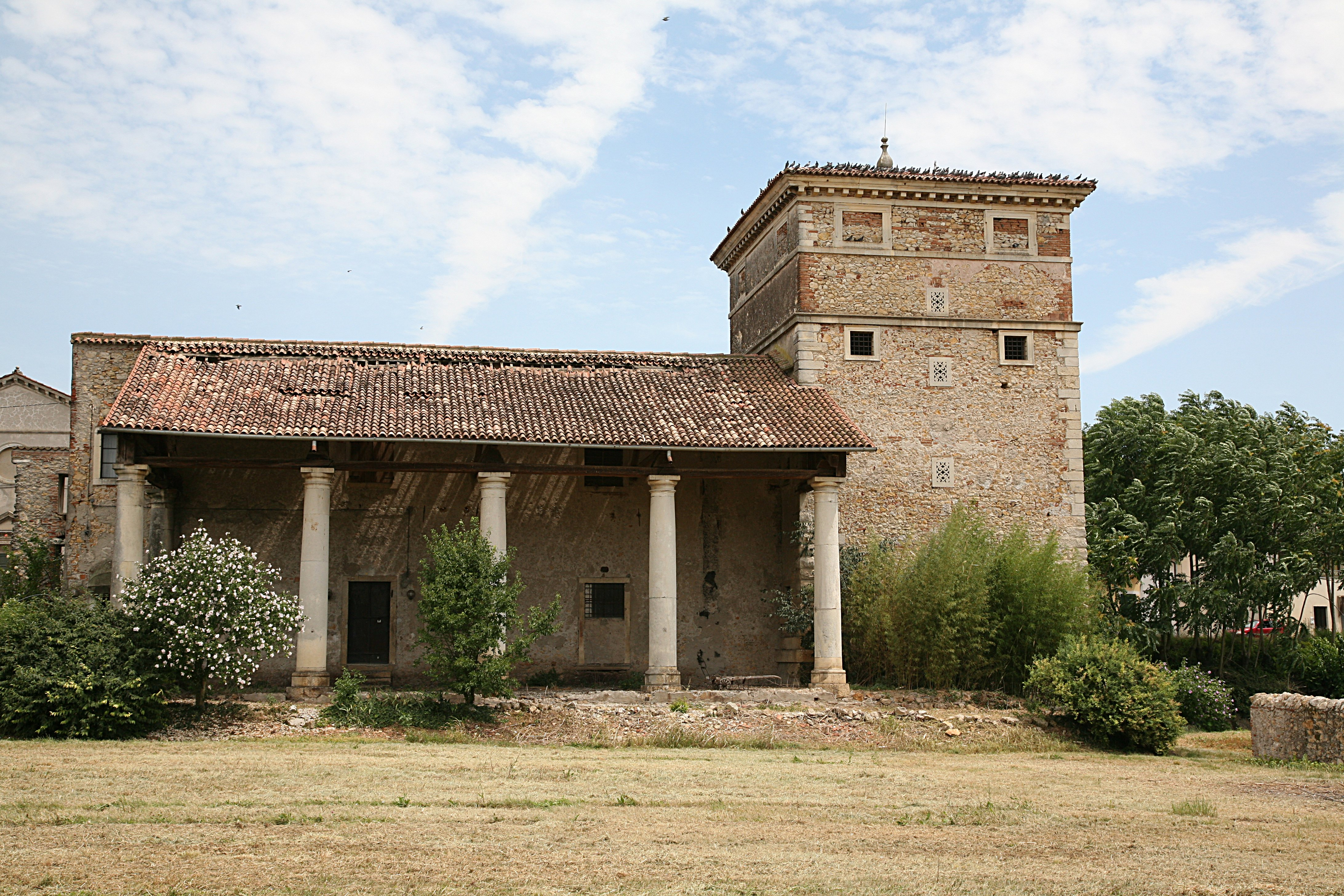
- Villa Trissino

- Location within Veneto Location within Italy
- Location: Sarego, Province of Vicenza, Veneto, Italy
- Part of: City of Vicenza and the Palladian Villas of the Veneto
- Criteria: Cultural: (i), (ii)
- Reference: 712bis-014
- Inscription: 1996 (20th Session)

Villa Trissino is an incomplete patrician villa designed by Italian Renaissance architect Andrea Palladio, situated in the hamlet of Meledo in the comune of Sarego in the Veneto, north-eastern Italy. It was intended for the brothers Ludovico and Francesco Trissino.

It is not to be confused with Villa Trissino at Cricoli, which is 20 km away, just outside Vicenza.

== History ==
Palladio included the project in book two of the I quattro libri dell'architettura, published in Venice in 1570. In the Quattro libri, Palladio affirms that he had begun the construction of a villa at Meledo for the brothers Ludovico and Francesco Trissino, ranking figures in the aristocracy of Vicenza and Palladio's patrons not only at Meledo but also at their city palace in the Contra’ Riale (1558) and at a small suburban casino. Palladio refers to the building as having been begun, and praises the site which includes a small hill. However, it is debatable how much of the multi-level design illustrated in the book was constructed – probably only a small part of the design was ever attempted. This did not prevent the plan from being influential: Thomas Jefferson's University of Virginia shows some similarities to it.

A number of Palladian villas differ from the illustrations in the Quattro libri. For example, at Villa Saraceno there is a Palladian house, but not the wings of the design published in 1570, and Villa Serego is also incomplete. At Villa Trissino, the visitor will find no Palladian house, only the start of the two extending wings can be seen. There is also a small rusticated gateway which recalls the Villa Serego.

== Architecture ==
The treatise engraving restores to us a view of an imposing structure, arranged on several levels, obviously inspired by the disposition of ancient Roman acropolis complexes. It is not possible to affirm whether this project had any practical outcome. On the other hand, evident traces of the beginning of the a Palladian project do exist in the imposing stone foundations of buildings along the river and in the two barchesse with Tuscan columns of fine workmanship. The most economic hypothesis would be that a project by Palladio existed for the Villa Trissino, although not necessarily identical to that presented in the Quattro libri. The latter seems rather to be the development of a theoretical scheme hypothetically conceived for the real site of Meledo.

Villa Trissino, like most of the Palladian villas, was to be the centre of an agricultural estate built for an aristocratic family. What survives at Meledo is two sections of the villa's extending colonnade, which would have been used for the utilitarian functions, something like a farmyard.

== Dovecote ==
At the end of the wing in the photo there is a dovecote, a feature also found at Villa Barbaro. The dovecote of Villa Trissino is decorated with frescoes, indicating that even within the utilitarian portions of the villa, great care was given to create aesthetic beauty. The dovecote tower was frescoed with grotesques by Eliodoro Forbicini (a Veronese painter mentioned by Vasari), who also worked in Palladio's Palazzo Chiericati and Palazzo Thiene. It is an evident sign that the building's function was not just utilitarian.

== Conservation status ==
In 1996, Villa Trissino was designated as part of the World Heritage Site "City of Vicenza and Palladian Villas of the Veneto". The buildings are in a poor state of conservation.

== Gallery ==
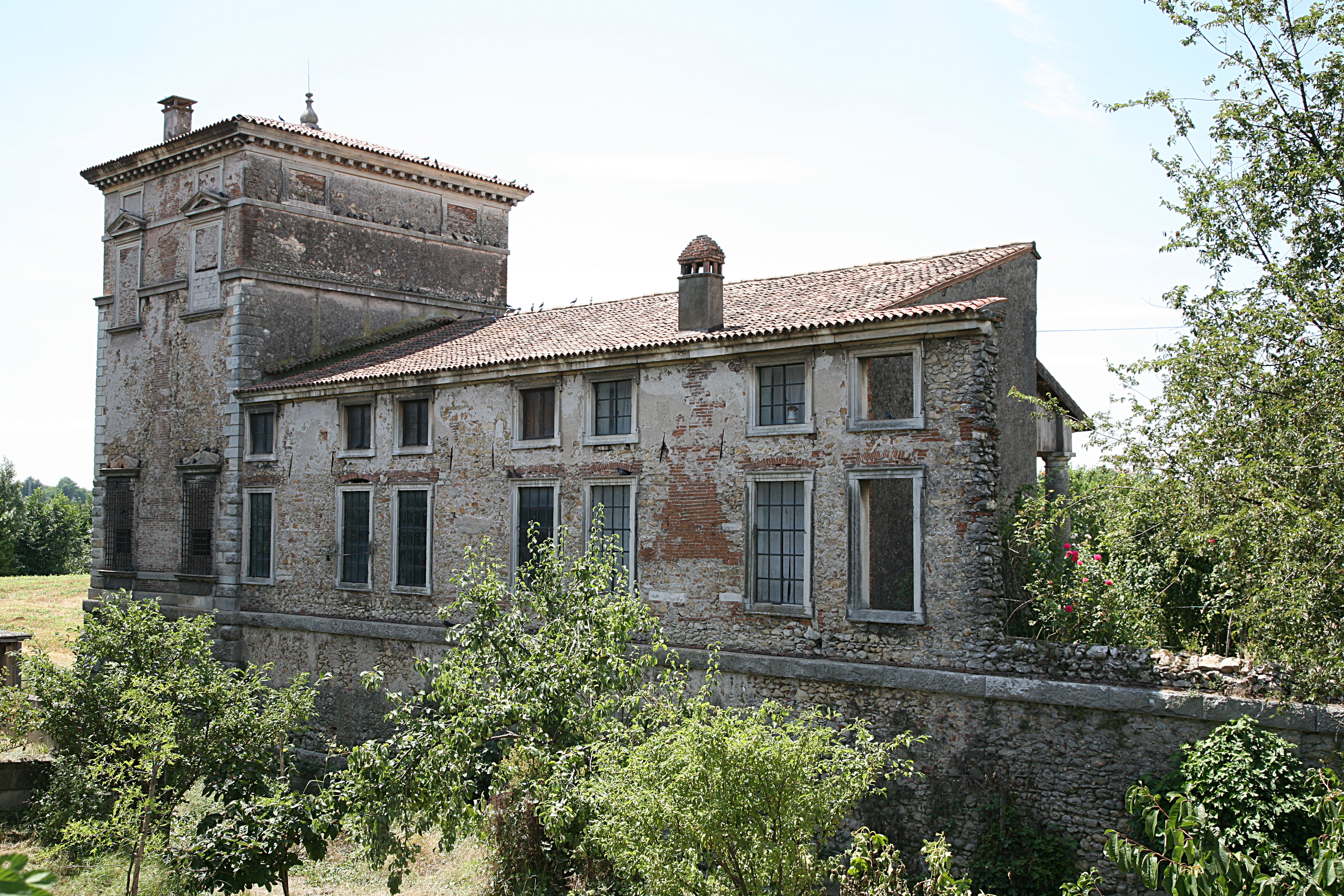
Rear view

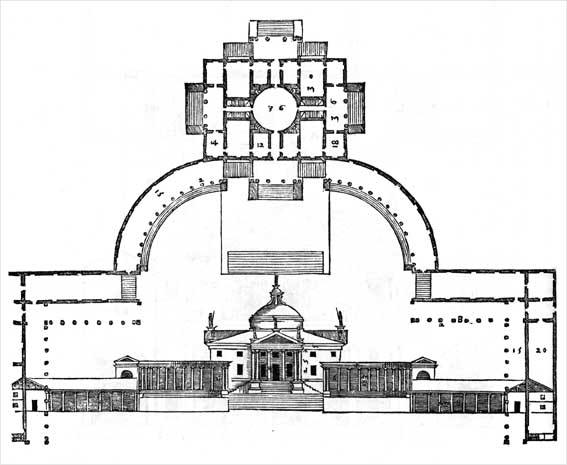
Projected Villa Trissino: woodcut from I quattro libri dell'architettura by Palladio (1570)

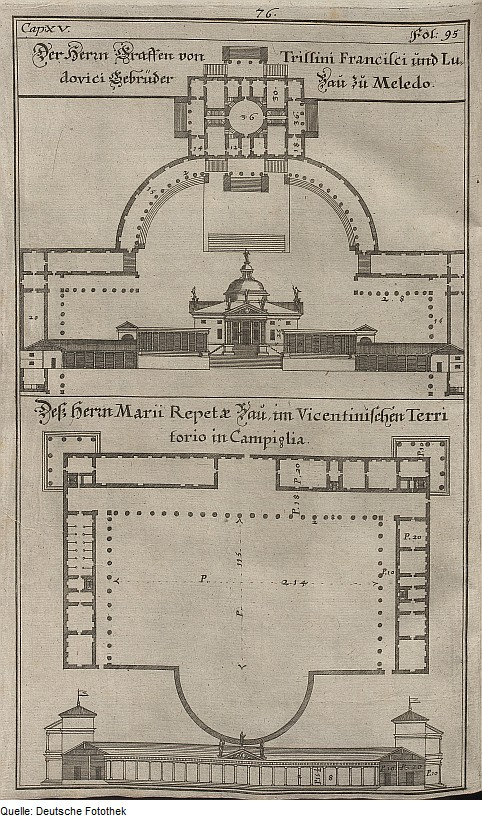

== See also ==
- Palladian Villas of the Veneto
- Palladian architecture
