= Sarego =

- Comune
- Comune di Sarego
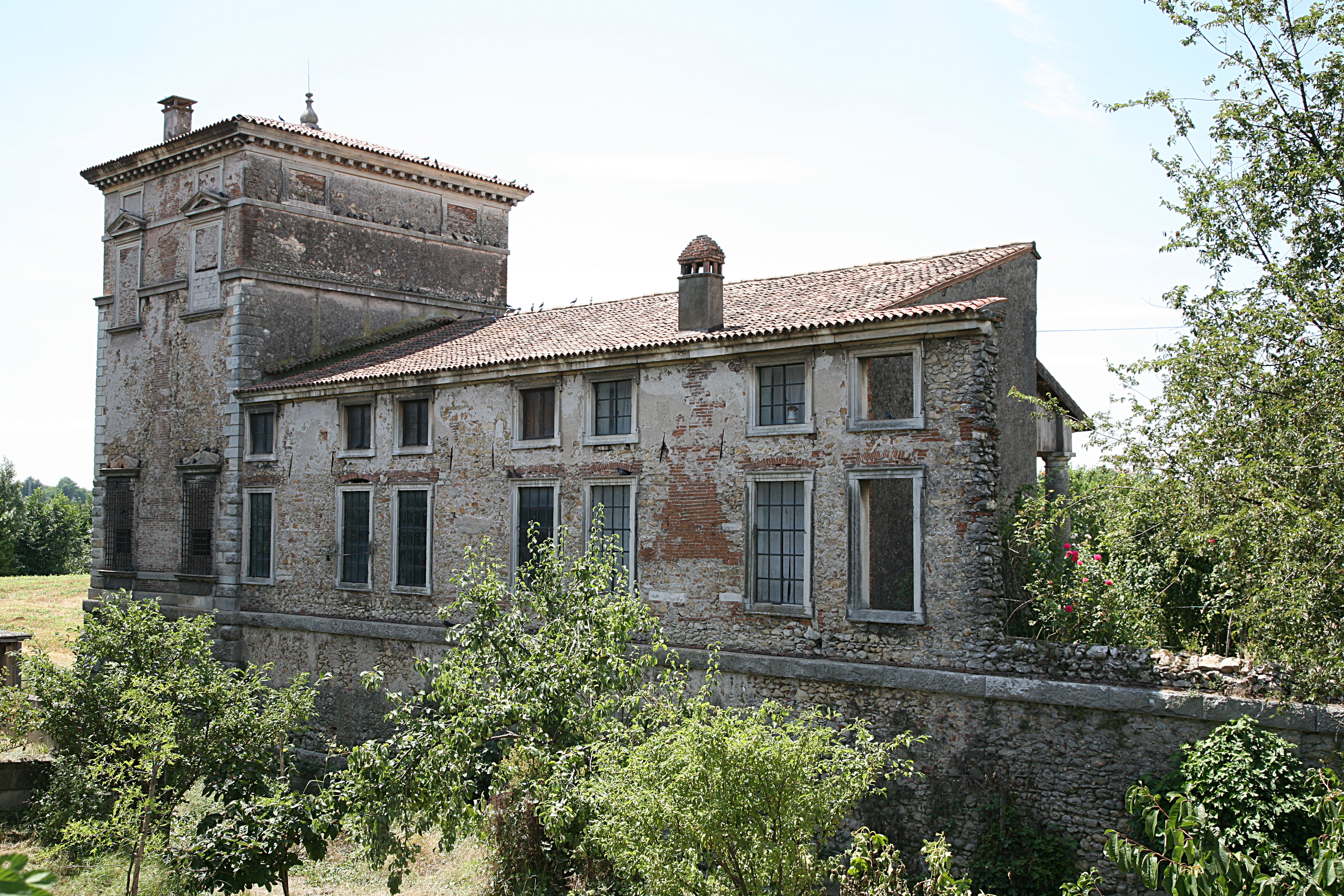
- View of Villa Trissino.

- Coat of arms

- Location within Italy Location within Veneto
- Coordinates: 45°25′N 11°24′E
- Country: Italy
- Region: Veneto
- Province: Vicenza (VI)
- Frazioni: Meledo, Monticello di Fara

Government
  - Mayor: Roberto Castiglion (Five Star Movement)

Area
  - Total: 23.92 km^{2} (9.24 sq mi)
- Elevation: 270 m (890 ft)

Population (31 December 2015)
  - Total: 6,794
  - Density: 284.0/km^{2} (735.6/sq mi)
- Demonym: Seraticensi
- Time zone: UTC+1 (CET)
  - Summer (DST): UTC+2 (CEST)
- Postal code: 36040
- Dialing code: 0444
- Patron saint: Maria SS. Assunta
- Saint day: August 15
- Website: Official website

Sarego is a town and comune in the province of Vicenza, Veneto, north-eastern Italy. It is 20 kilometres (12 mi) southwest of Vicenza. SP500 goes through the town of Sarego.

== Main sights ==
In the frazione of Meledo, there are two incomplete villas designed by Andrea Palladio:

- Villa Trissino
- Villa Arnaldi

== Sport ==
- The primary football club is A.C. M.M. Sarego A.S.D.
- The Moto Club La Favorita Sarego organised motorcycle speedway events at La Favorita, off the Via Julia Divisione in nearby Monticello di Fara. The venue hosted a qualifying round of the Speedway World Championship for three consecutive years from 1974 to 1976. The speedway ended in 1982, when it was converted into a football facility for ASD La Favorita 93.

== Sources ==
- (Google Maps)
- Page at Comuni Italiani
