= Jewel of Vicenza =

Sculpture by Andrea Palladio

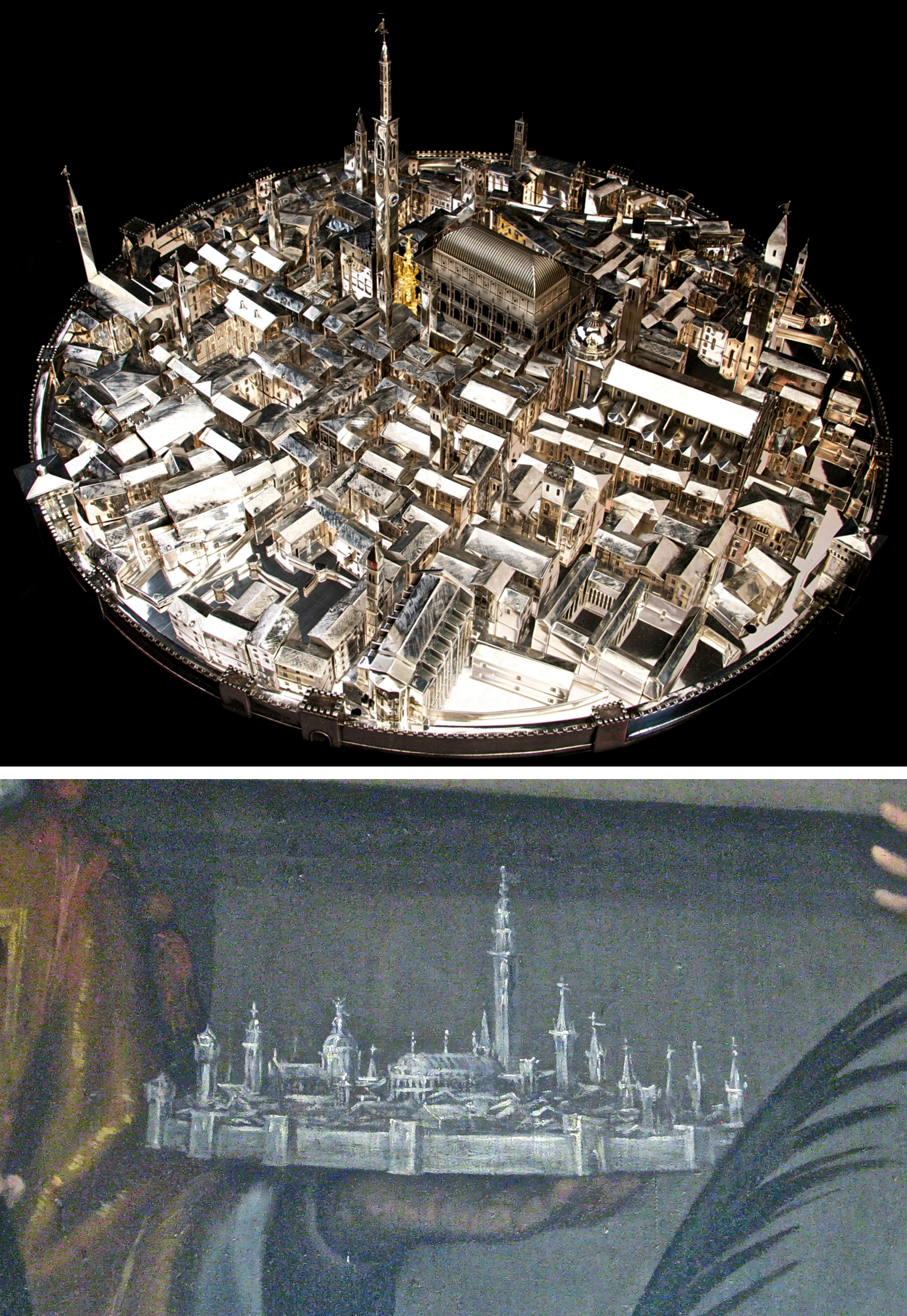
- Top: recent reconstruction Bottom: painting of model from the 16th century
- Artist: Giorgio Capobianco, Andrea Palladio
- Year: 1578, 2012-13
- Type: Sculpture
- Medium: Silver
- Dimensions: 25 cm (10 in); 58 cm diameter (23 in)
- Condition: Lost and rebuilt
- Location: Museo Diocesano; Vicenza

The Jewel of Vicenza (Italian: Gioiello di Vicenza) was a silver model of the city of Vicenza made as an ex-voto in the 16th century and attributed to the architect Andrea Palladio. The Jewel was stolen by the Napoleonic army during the Italian Campaign in the French Revolutionary Wars and subsequently destroyed. A copy was created between 2012 and 2013.

== History ==
The precious Jewel was made of silver plates on a wood frame. It was completed in 1578. It's not certain that Andrea Palladio created the model, but the bond between two Bishops of Vicenza (Niccolò Ridolfi and his successor Matteo Priuli) suggests that Palladio's role as director of city life was more important than his role as architect. For him, the Jewel might have represented his mental conception of the city of Vicenza. It can possibly be attributed to a goldsmith of the Capobianco family, as is supported by a document found in 2012 in the "Sanctuary of the Madonna" of Monte Berico.

The citizens offered the Jewel as an ex-voto to the "Madonna of Mount Berico" in order to avoid the Plague of Saint Charles Borromeo that had spread two years before in the Duchy of Milan with some infection cases in the western cities of the Republic of Venice and up to Verona. Despite poor conditions, the citizenship united and provided a modest gift from each family. Vicenza was spared (until the great Italian plague of 1629–1631), so the Jewel was initially displayed in the church of Monte Berico next to the "Santuario della Madonna di Monte Berico".

Between the 17th and the 18th century, six oil paintings were made that represented the first patron saint of the city, Saint Vincent, holding the silver Jewel in his hands. The paintings that portray Saint Vincent holding the precious model are the main evidence we have of the model's appearance. The paintings show the Jewel from different points of view, which provides information about its three-dimensional form. The model is a main element in each of the pictures; Vicenza is seen from the front, offered by Saint Vincent, and enclosed in its medieval walls. In that period, the distinction between the borghi (boroughs) over the walls and the inner part of the city, nowadays the Old Town of Vicenza, already existed.

Paintings of the Jewel of Vicenza
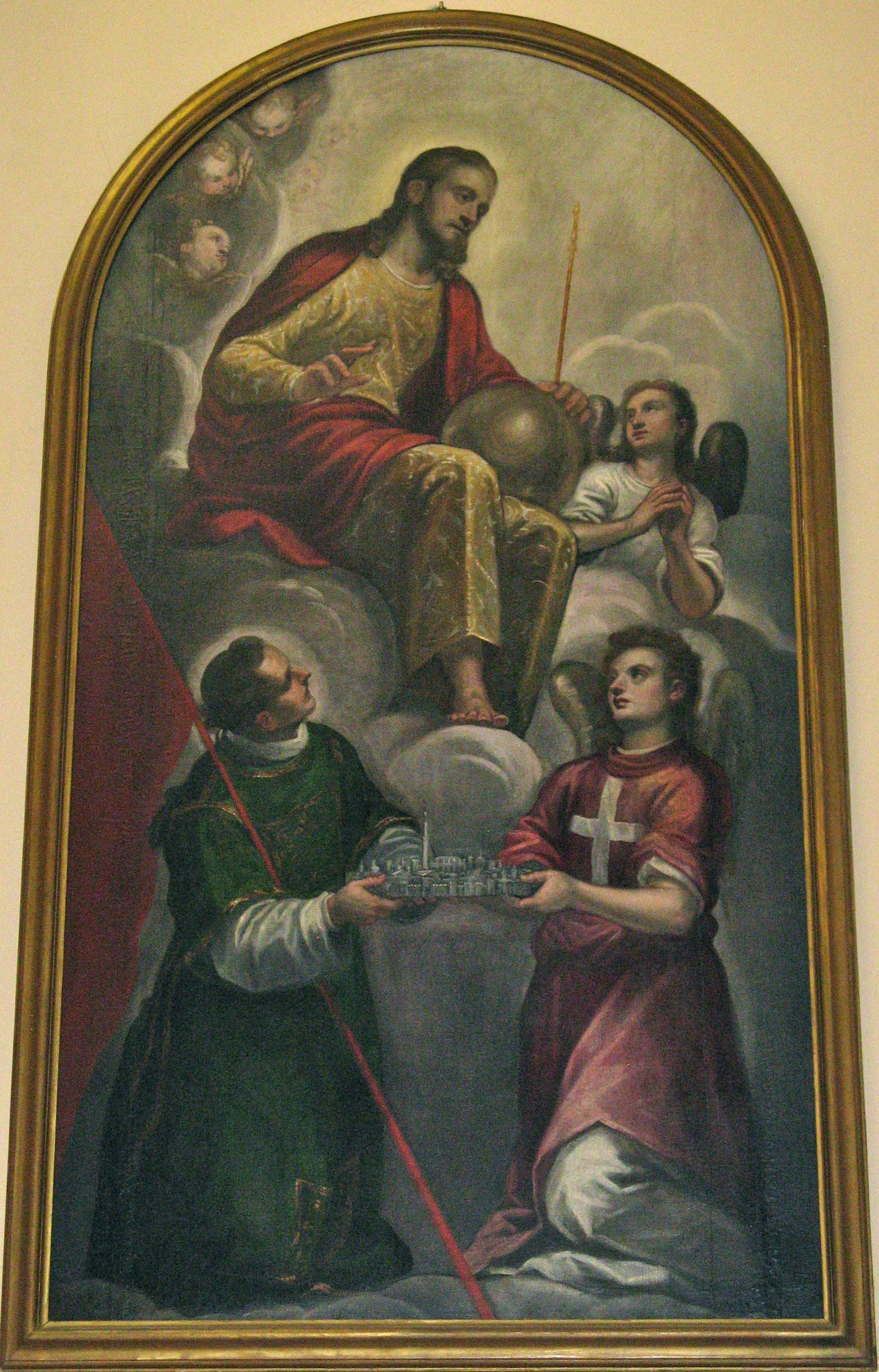
Alessandro Maganza, San Vincenzo e un angelo presentano a Cristo il modello della città di Vicenza, 1593, Pojana Maggiore, the Parish Church

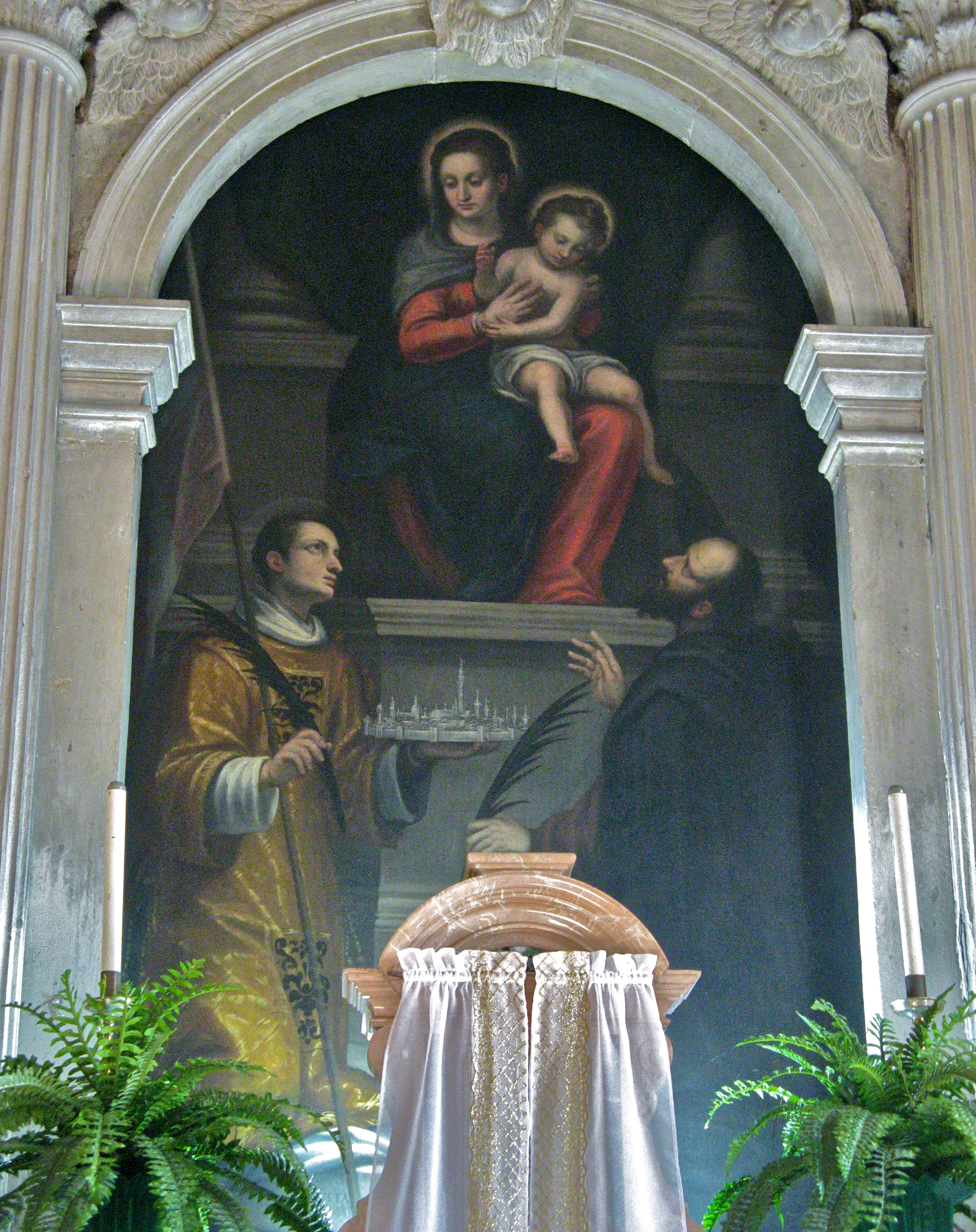
Alessandro Maganza, Madonna con il Bambino, sant’Anastasio e san Vincenzo con il modello della città di Vicenza, 1613, Thiene, St Vincent Church

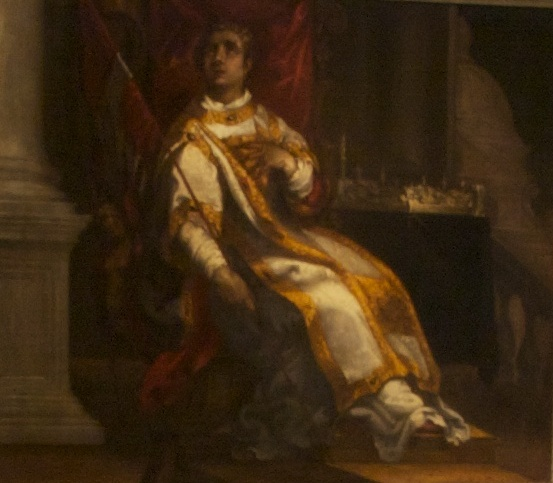
Francesco Maffei, San Vincenzo col modello della città di Vicenza, 1625, Vicenza, the Diocesan Museum

Under the Napoleonic government, the French troops looted Vicenza of cultural artifacts in 1797, as they did throughout most of Italy. The armée française, having seized the Sanctuary, brought the Jewel of Vicenza back to France because they thought it was completely made out of silver. They attempted to melt the model down, but it burned instead, as it was made of wood and only covered by a silver coating. With its destruction, Vicenza lost an important artifact from its century-long history of goldsmithing.

== Reconstruction ==
In May 2010, a Committee for the Jewel of Vicenza was founded with the support of the Office of Cultural Heritage and other local institutions. The committee held a competition for a virtual restoration of the Jewel. The competition was won by the architect Romano Concato from Trissino, who compensated for the absence of original drawings by studying two paintings by Francesco Maffei and two others by Alessandro Maganza. The reconstruction was also developed by referencing medieval planimetrics of the city, the Pianta Angelica, designed by Giovanni Pittoni in 1580.

In 2011, the Committee began the second part of its project—a collection of silver donations in order to recreate the model for Vicenza, as happened for the ancient ex-voto. The collection had 66 lb (30 kg) as its minimum target. In 2012, more than 110 lb (50 kg) of silver were collected (enough for the project), but ten of the most important goldsmiths of the city went on collecting until 25 December, to create additional funds for the reconstruction and its display.

=== Features ===
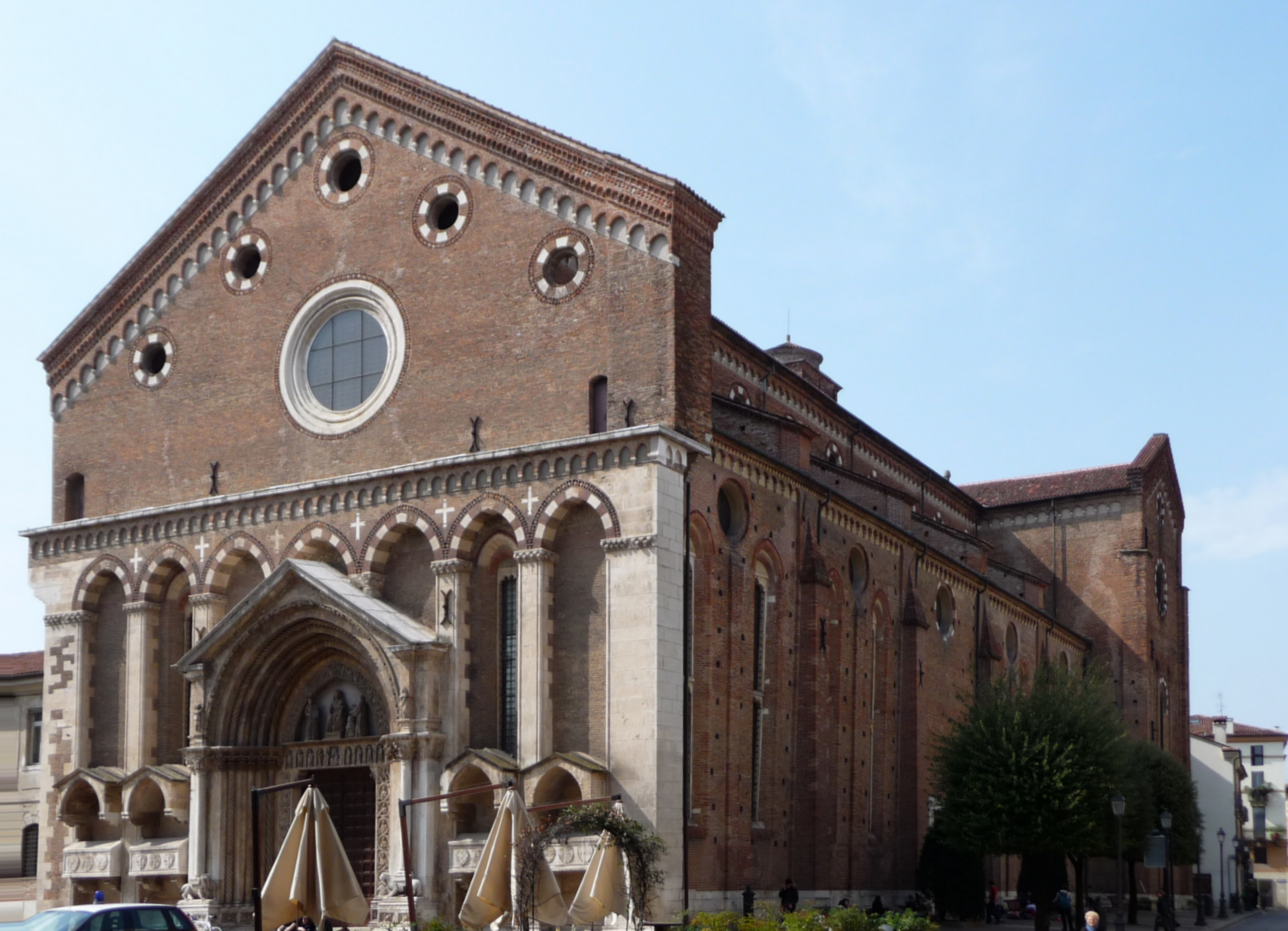
The church of San Lorenzo, the first building completed in the reconstruction

The new Jewel of Vicenza is a large round silver tray with a diameter of 58 cm (23 in) that supports more than 300 models of Vicenza buildings. Sixty-one of the models represent buildings of historical importance, such as the Basilica Palladiana, the Cathedral, the Torre Bissara, and dozens of churches. In the center of Piazza dei Signori, a gold model of the Rua was added, unannounced.

The reconstruction of the Jewel was designed by proportioning the models using the golden ratio and studying the size of buildings from the time of its original construction so the three-dimensional reconstruction could be as close to the original as possible. The reconstruction started with small sculptures in modelled wax that served as a model for subsequent casting. The cast elements were then finished and embellished with chiseling and engraving.

The model is made of 925/1000 silver. The final weight was 33 lb (15 kg); and the total effort took around 2,000 hours of work.

=== Presentation ===
On 15 June 2012 in Piazza dei Signori an official presentation on the reconstruction was held. Afterwards, the work began, combining the craftsmanship of silversmith Carlo Rossi and the sophisticated laser technology offered by a company in Bressanvido. In September 2012, at the Gallerie di Palazzo Leoni Montanari the finished tray was presented with its first complete building, the Church of San Lorenzo. From 6 April to 9 June 2013, halfway through the reconstruction, the Jewel was exhibited at the Diocesan Museum with the support of FAI. In the summer of 2013 the Jewel was completed; it was returned to the citizens for the town's patronal feast on 7 September. The reconstruction was included in the usual procession to the Basilica of St. Mary of Mount Berico in an official ceremony that had 30,000 participants.

The Jewel is now permanently housed at the Diocesan Museum and placed next to the painting by Maffei, San Vincenzo with the model of the city of Vicenza.

In 2015, the Jewel was exhibited at Expo 2015 in Milan. At the exhibition, silversmith Carlo Rossi was awarded the Confartigianato Design Award 2015 for his creation of the reconstruction.

The Jewel's Reconstruction
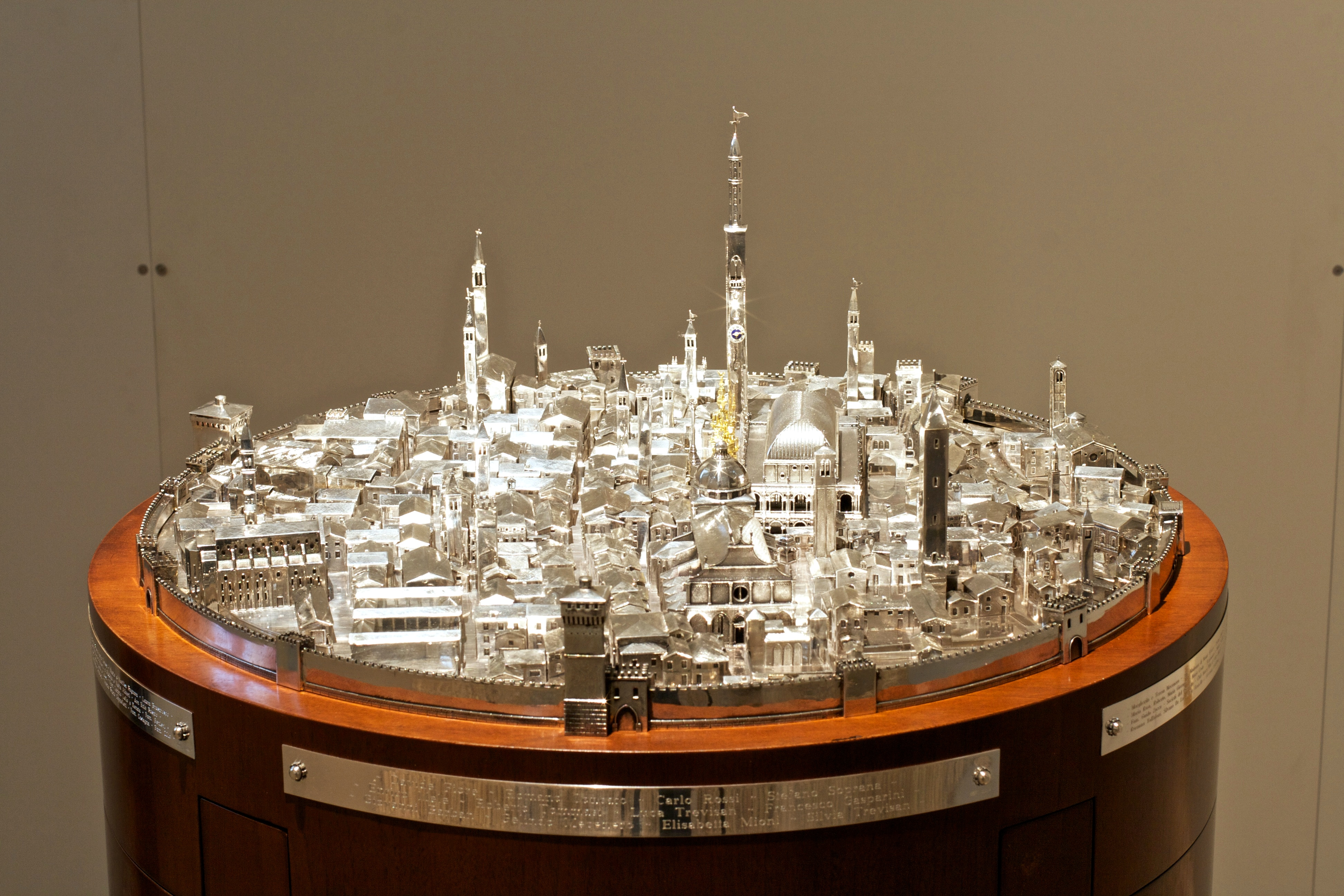
The completed Jewel, in its display

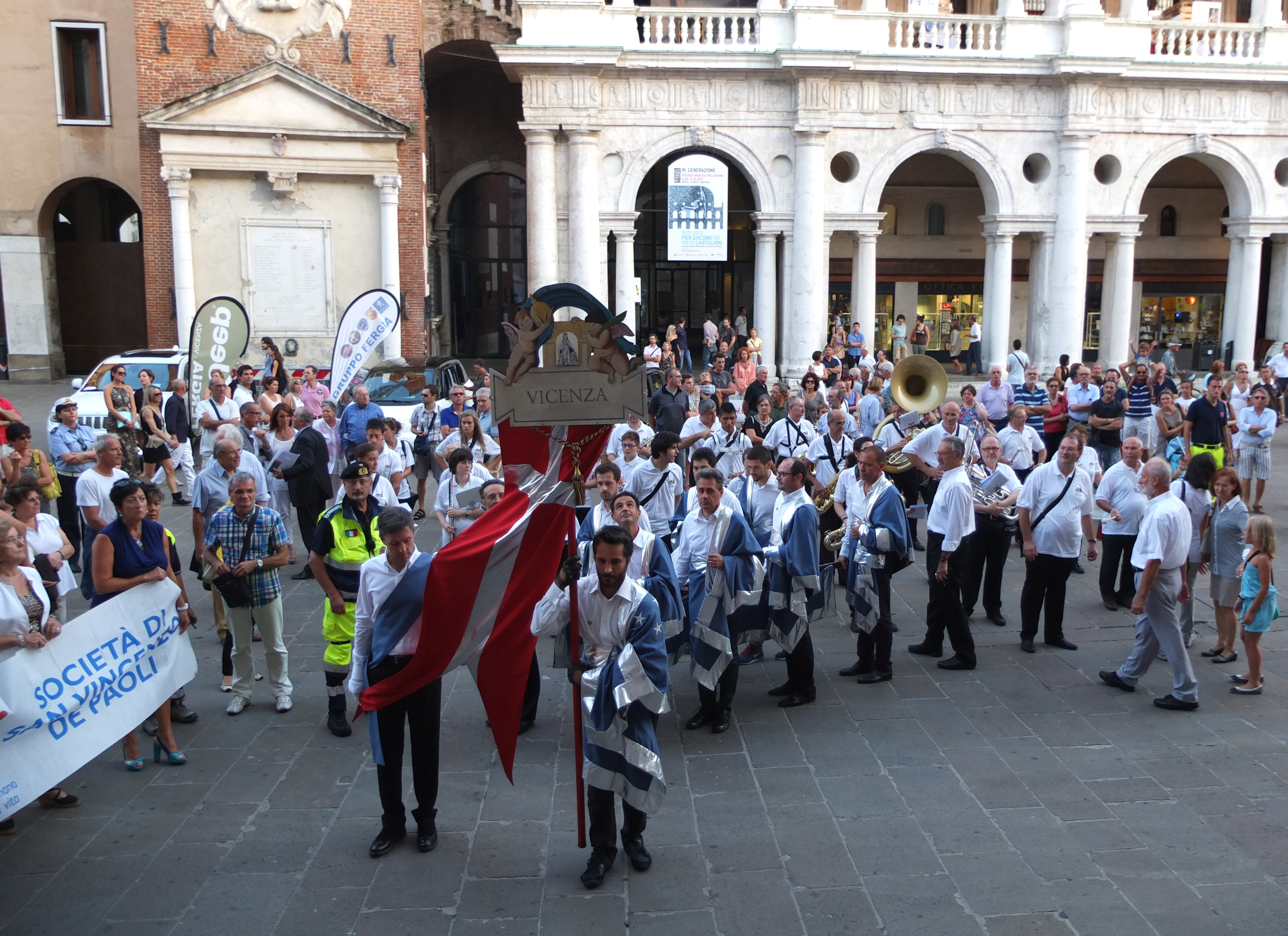
An image of the first Transport of the Jewel of Vicenza to Monte Berico, on the evening of 7 September 2013

== Bibliography ==
- Franco Barbieri, Renato Cevese (2004). Vicenza, ritratto di una città (Barbieri, 2004 ed.). Vicenza: Angelo Colla editore. ISBN 88-900990-7-0.
- Emilio Franzina, Neri Pozza (1980). Vicenza. Storia di una città (1404-1866) (Franzina, 1980 ed.). Vicenza: Neri Pozza Edizioni. ISBN 88-7305-333-5.
- Franco Barbieri (1973). La pianta prospettica di Vicenza del 1580 (Barbieri, 1973 ed.). Vicenza: Neri Pozza Edizioni. ISBN 8873053726.
- Sergio Marinelli, Chiara Rigoni (2003). Theatrum urbis: personaggi e vedute di Vicenza (Marinelli, 2003 ed.). Verona: Fondazione Cassa di Risparmio Verona, Vicenza, Belluno e Ancona.
