= Torre Bissara =

Tower in Vicenza, Italy

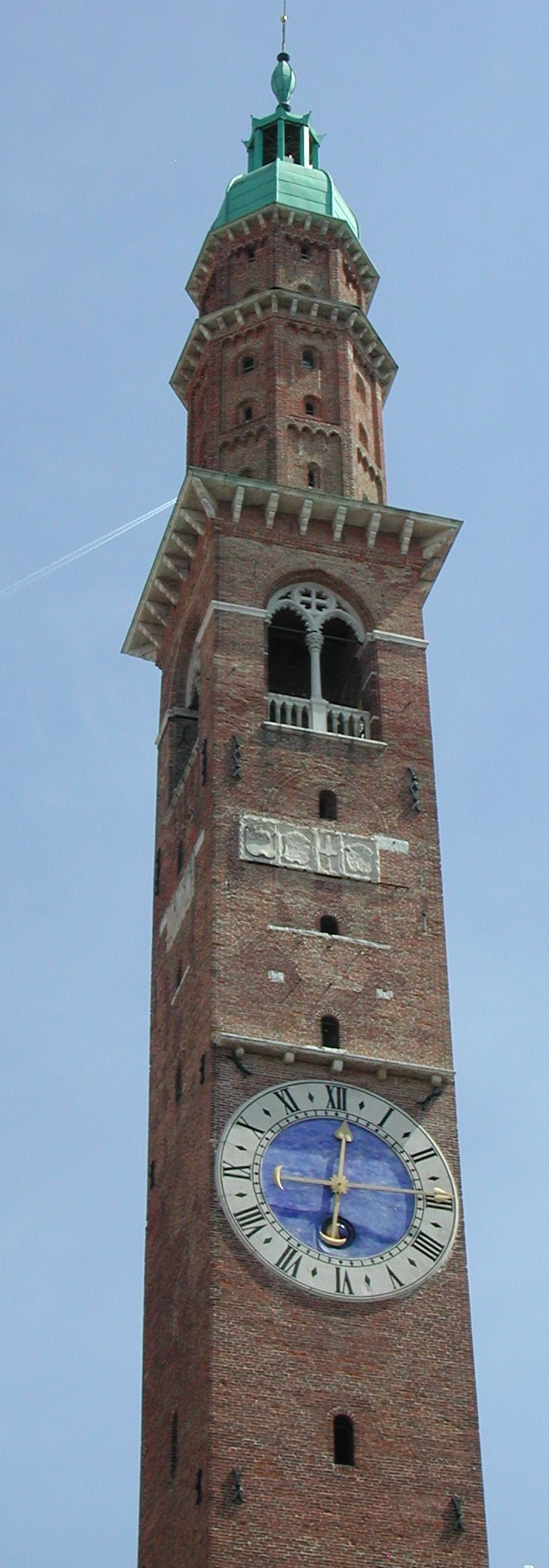
- Interactive map of the Torre Bissara area

General information
- Type: Bell tower
- Architectural style: Gothic architecture
- Location: Vicenza, Veneto, Italy
- Coordinates: 45.5474°N 11.5469°E
- Completed: 1174

Dimensions
- Other dimensions: 82 metres (269 ft)

Website
- https://www.venetoinside.com/hidden-treasures/post/the-bissara-tower-in-piazza-dei-signori-in-vicenza/

Torre Bissara is a tower in Piazza dei Signori, Vicenza, Italy.

== History ==
Bissara Tower is a civic tower that overlooks Piazza dei Signori, alongside the famous Basilica Palladiana. At 82 meters high, it is one of the tallest buildings in Vicenza.

The earliest records date back to 1174 when the tower was built at the behest of the family Bissari, next to their palazzo. Between 1211 and 1229 the municipality of Vicenza bought both the building (with the intention of turning it into the mayor's office) and the tower. The tower was not damaged in the terrible earthquake of January 25, 1347. In the mid- fifteenth century the tower was raised to the present height. The relics of saints and five bells were placed inside. Over the centuries, many interventions were done to maintain the stability and beauty of the tower.

The history of the city is described in its stones: on top there is a headless statue of the goddess Athena from the Roman era; almost at the top there is the marble bas-relief of the Lion of Saint Mark, symbol of the Serenissima; at the base is a triumphal arch with the war memoria.

On 18 March 1945, the tower (along with the Palladian Basilica) was hit in an Anglo-American bombing raid. The top of the tower caught fire and the dome collapsed to the ground: the tower was severed. The bells also had fallen off, destroying the pavement of the square. Together with the Basilica, in the years after the tower was rebuilt, not without controversy concerning the form, in part different from the original. Not all of the bells were also relocated, nor the ball indicating the moon's phases (which was placed under the clock).

In 2002 a radical restoration of the tower was approved. The interventions addressed two issues: first the subsidence of the foundations (an ever-present problem in Vicenza given the abundance of water in the subsoil), the secondly, the restoration of the external surfaces, ornaments and decorations. The dial has been painted cobalt blue (as it was originally), the sphere of the moon's phases (thanks to a donation from a well-known jeweller) has been repositioned and the bells replaced (donation by the Rotary Club Vicenza Berici).

A feature of the tower is, in addition to the normal sound of the hours and half-hours, also the ninth hour. This is a particular melody composed by Maestro Valtinoni (restored in 2005) is played seven minutes before noon and seven minutes before six p.m. The largest bell, in a tone of E, was created in 1663 by the foundry of Christopher Murari.

== Gallery ==
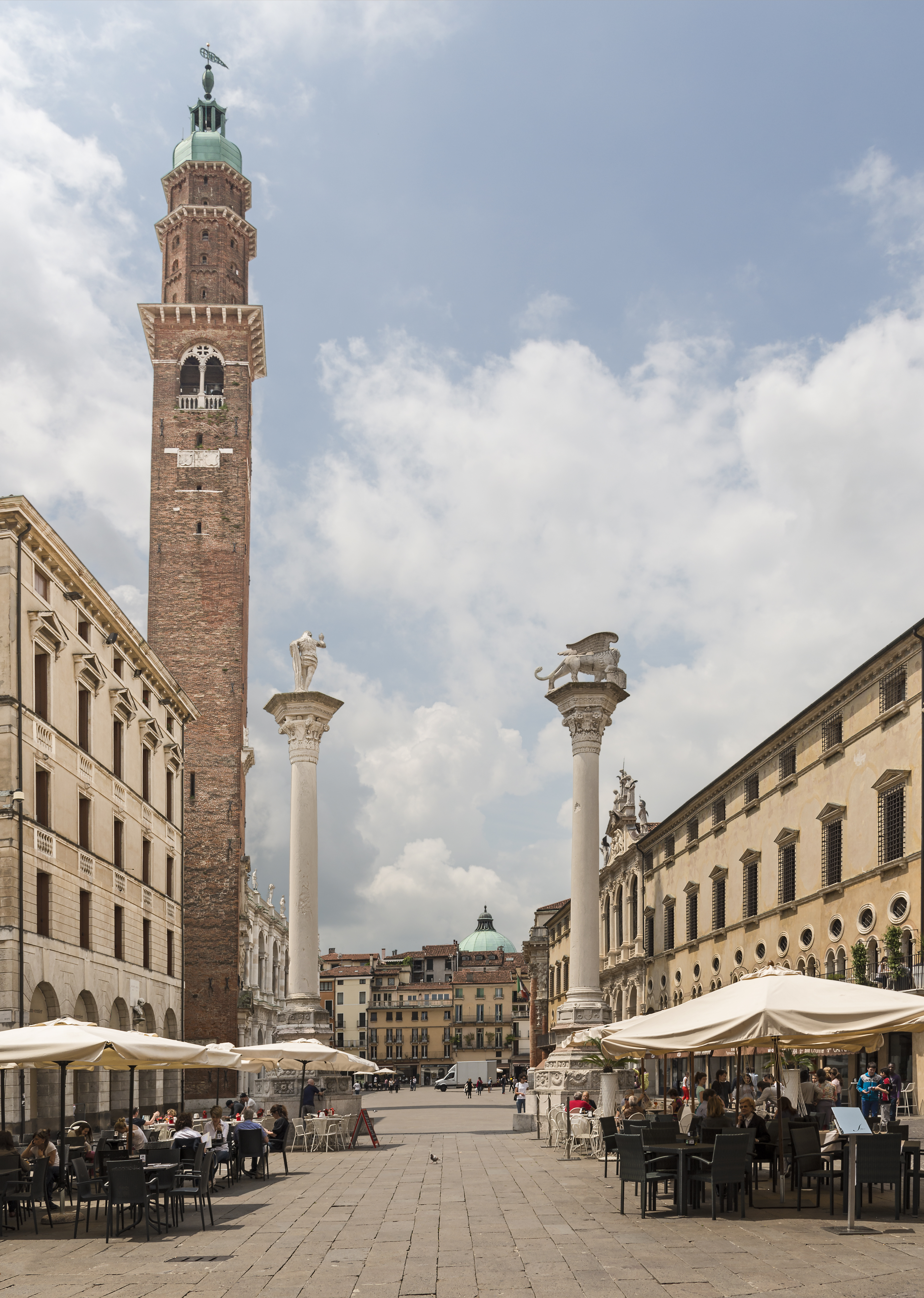
Torre Bissara' in Piazza dei Signori

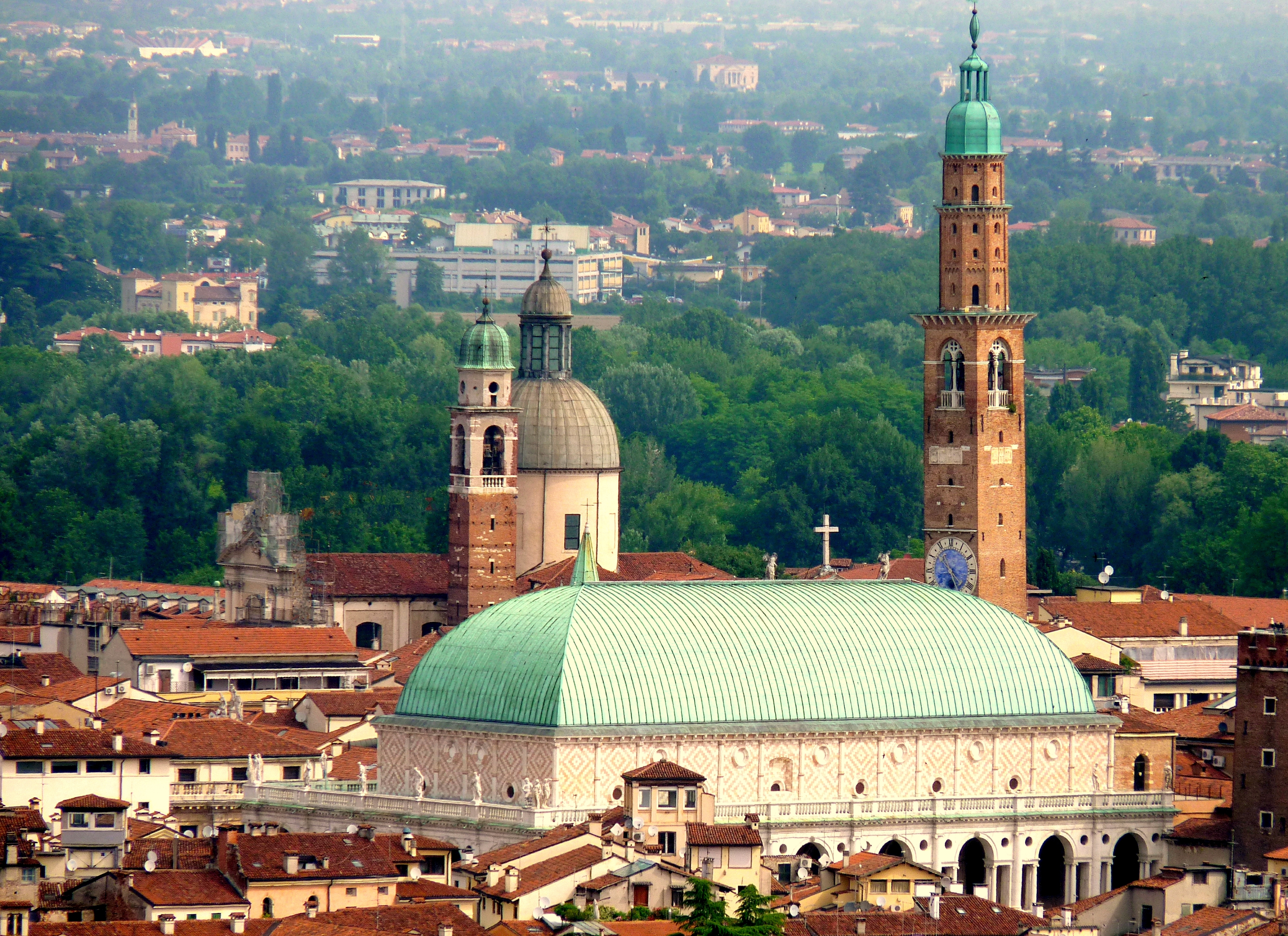
Panorama da Monte Berico

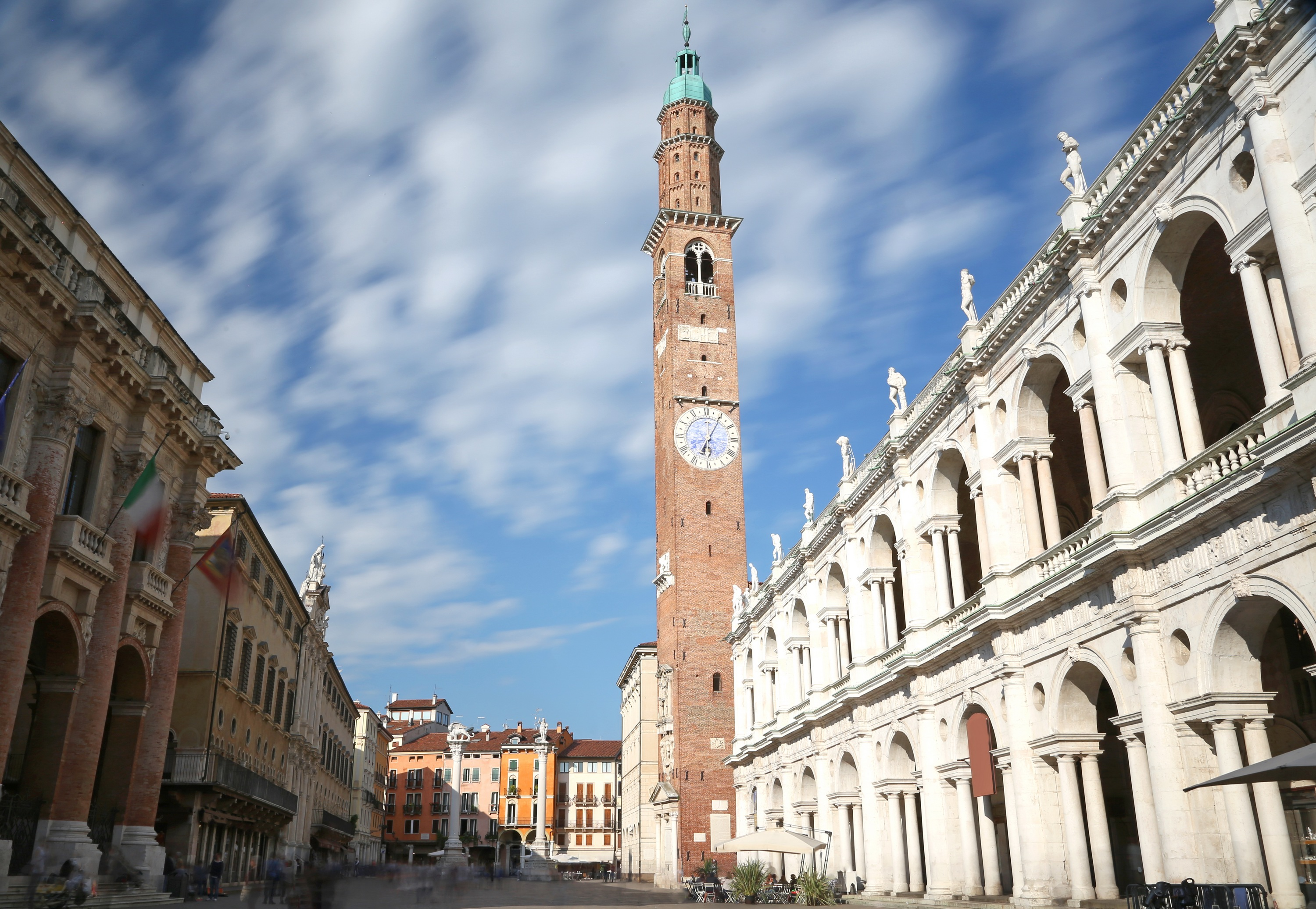
Basilica Palladiana a Vicenza Italy and Piazza dei Signori and Loggia del Capitaniato Palace

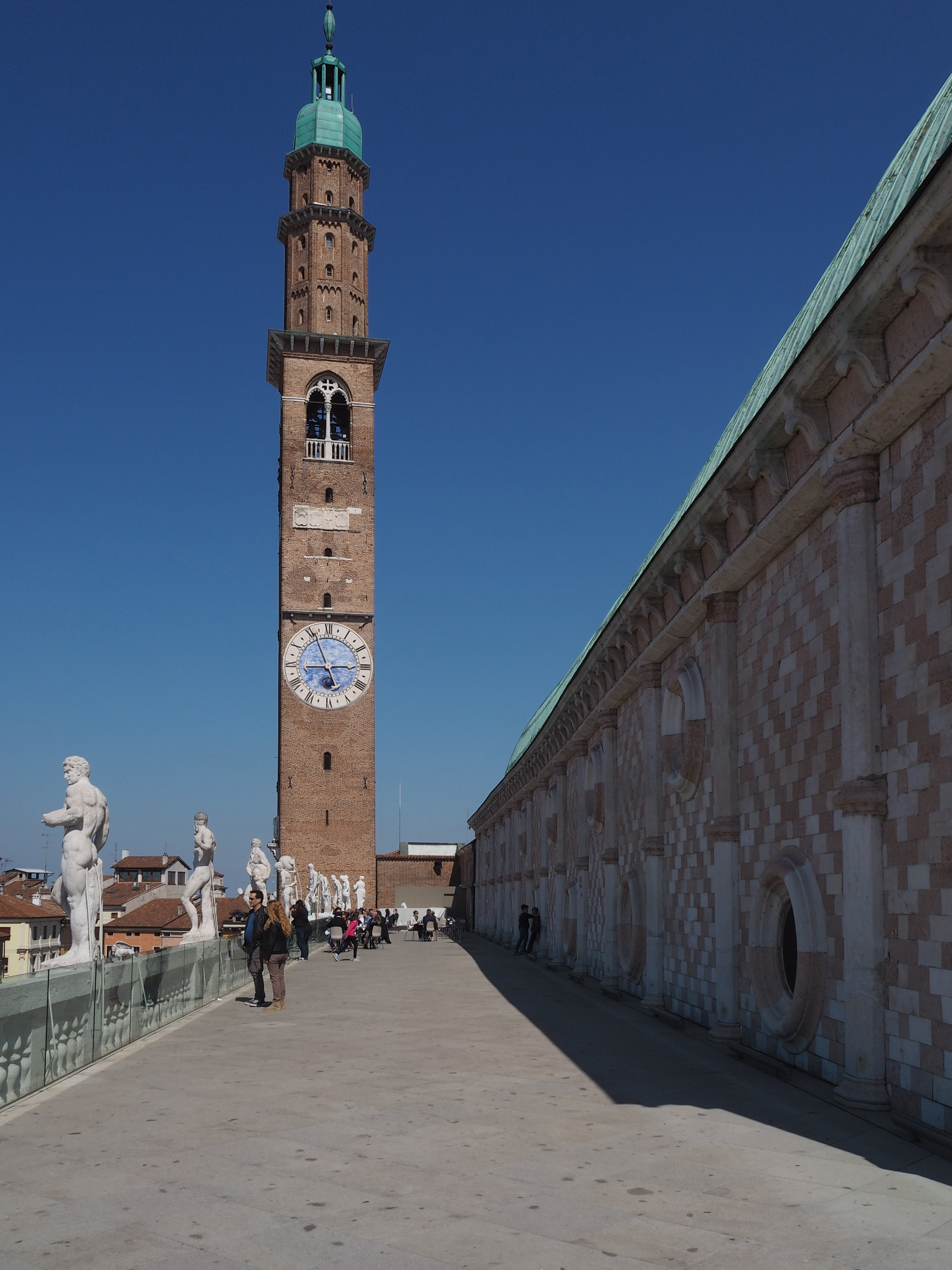
