= Piazza dei Signori, Vicenza =

Public space

Coordinates: 45.547292°N 11.546587°E

Piazza dei Signori has been a city square in Vicenza, Italy for centuries, and is surrounded by notable Palladian buildings.

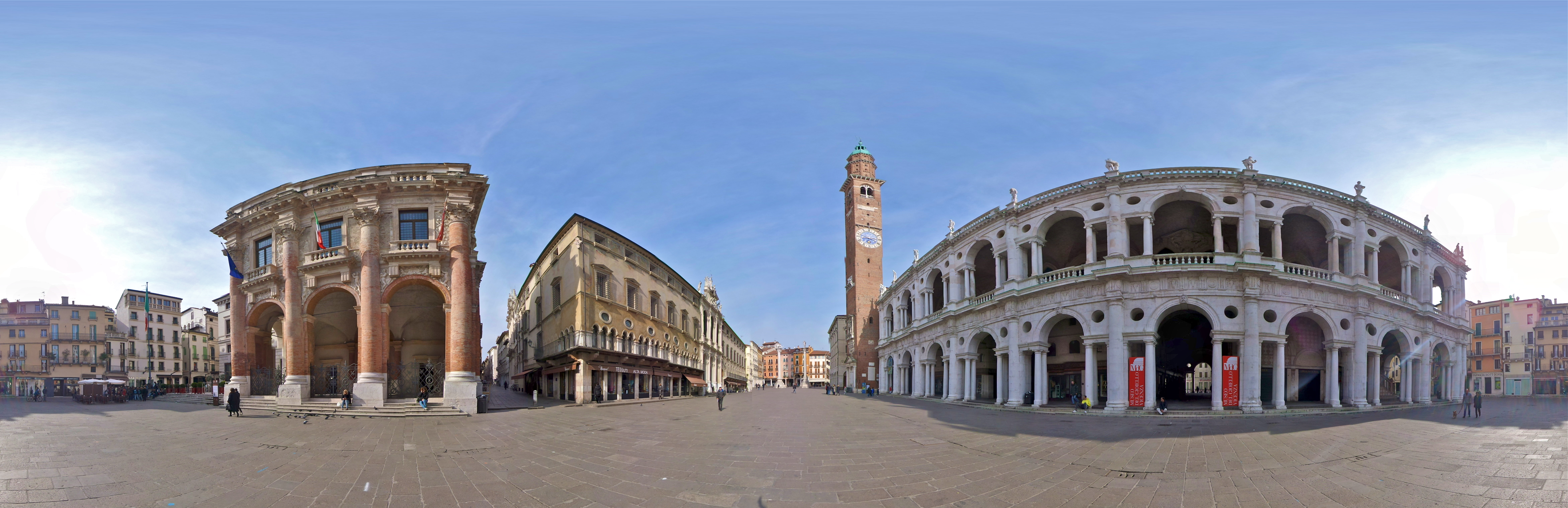
Piazza dei Signori

== Buildings around the square ==
Buildings around the square include:

- Basilica Palladiana
- Torre Bissara
- Palazzo del Capitaniato
- Palazzo del Monte di Pietà, Vicenza
- San Vincenzo, Vicenza
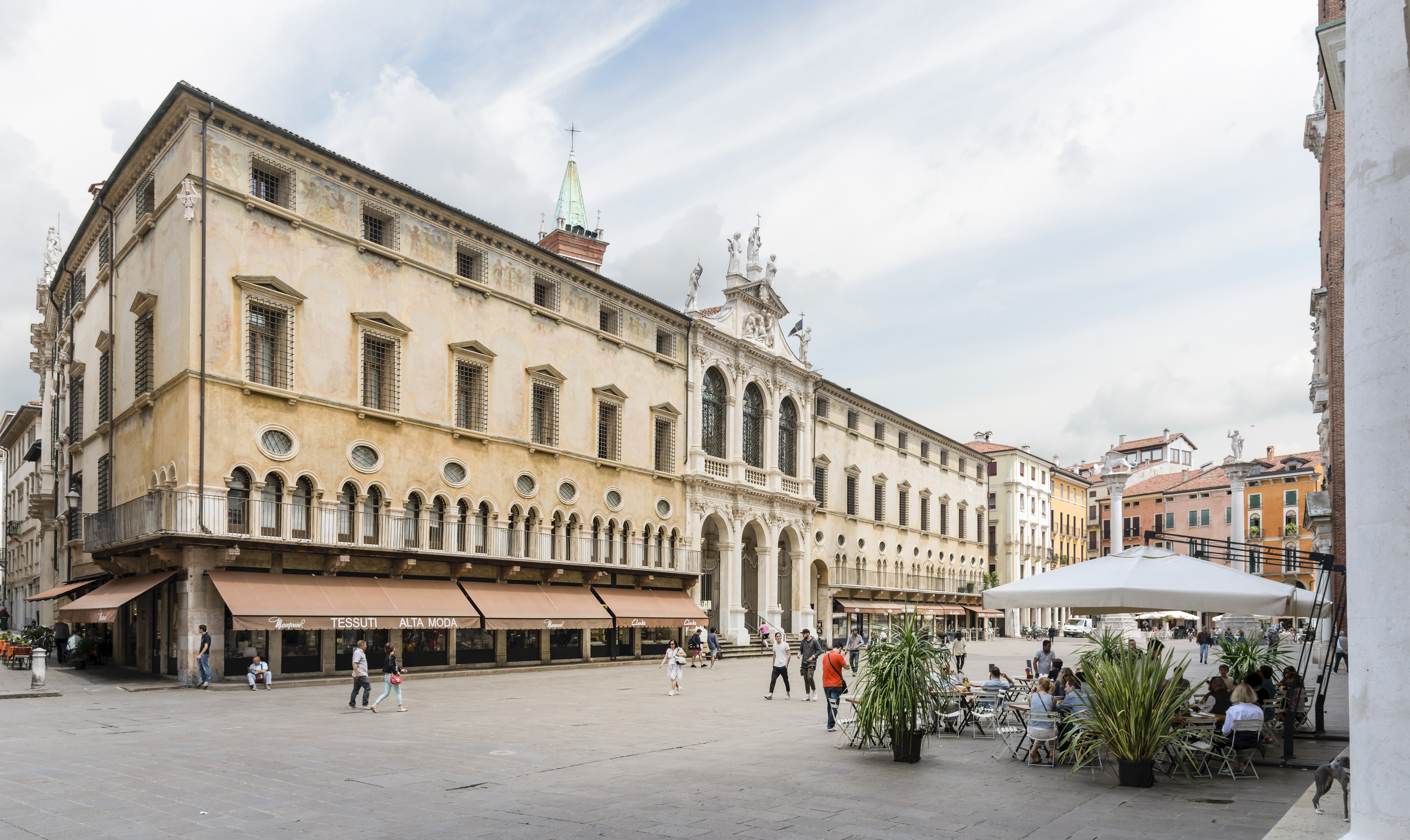
Palazzo del Monte di Pietà

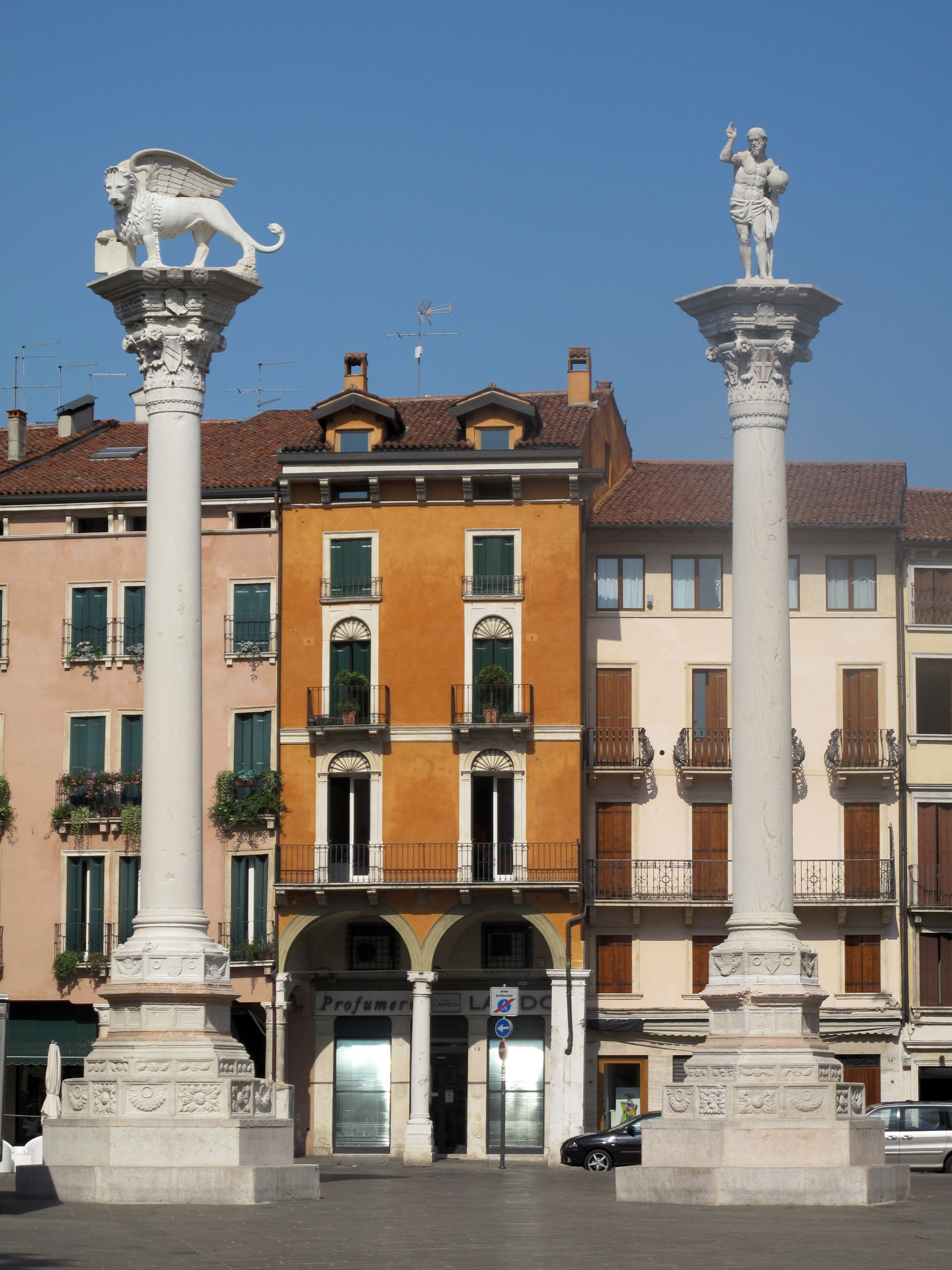
Lion of Saint Mark and Redentore

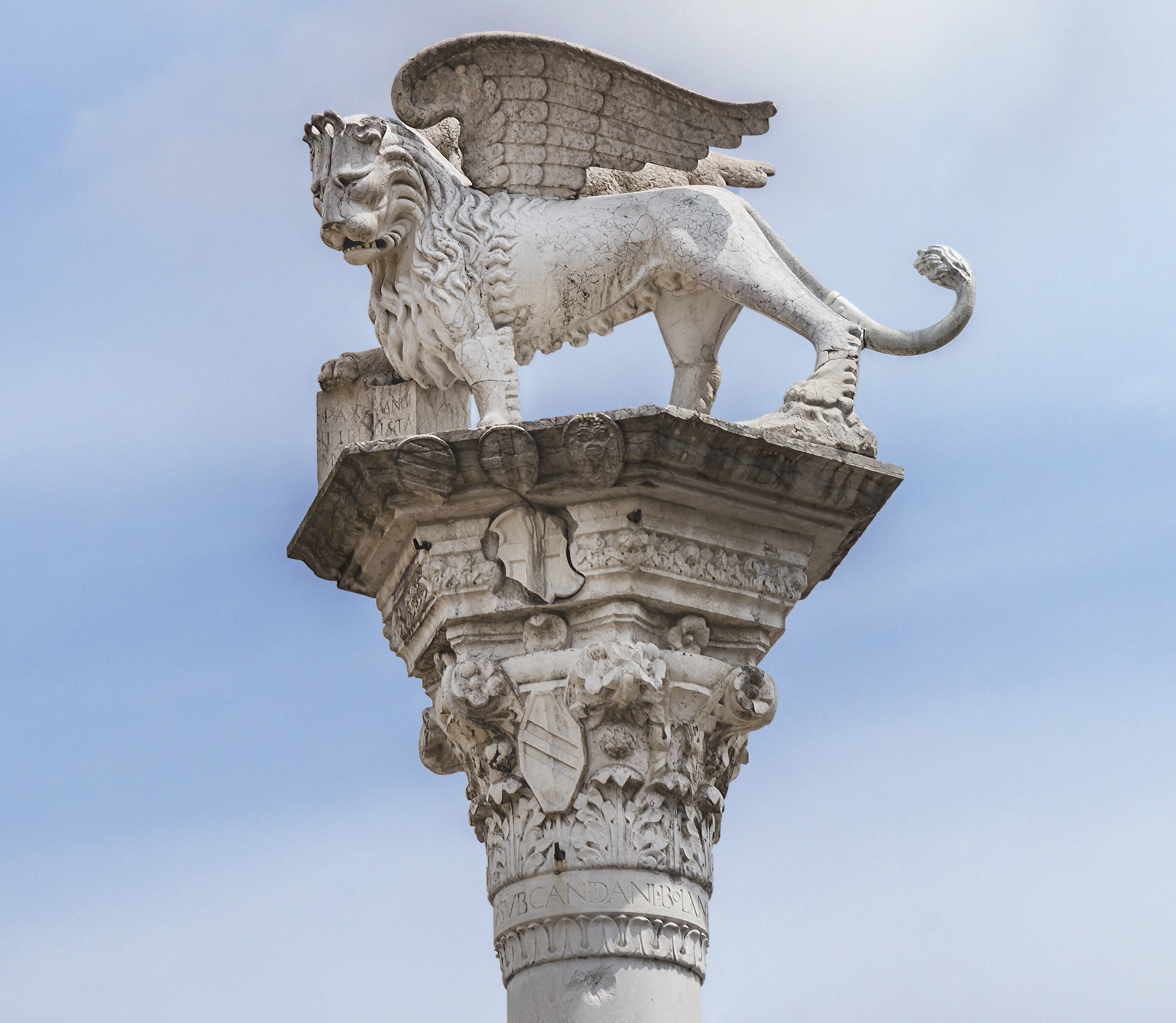
Statue of the Lion of Saint Mark

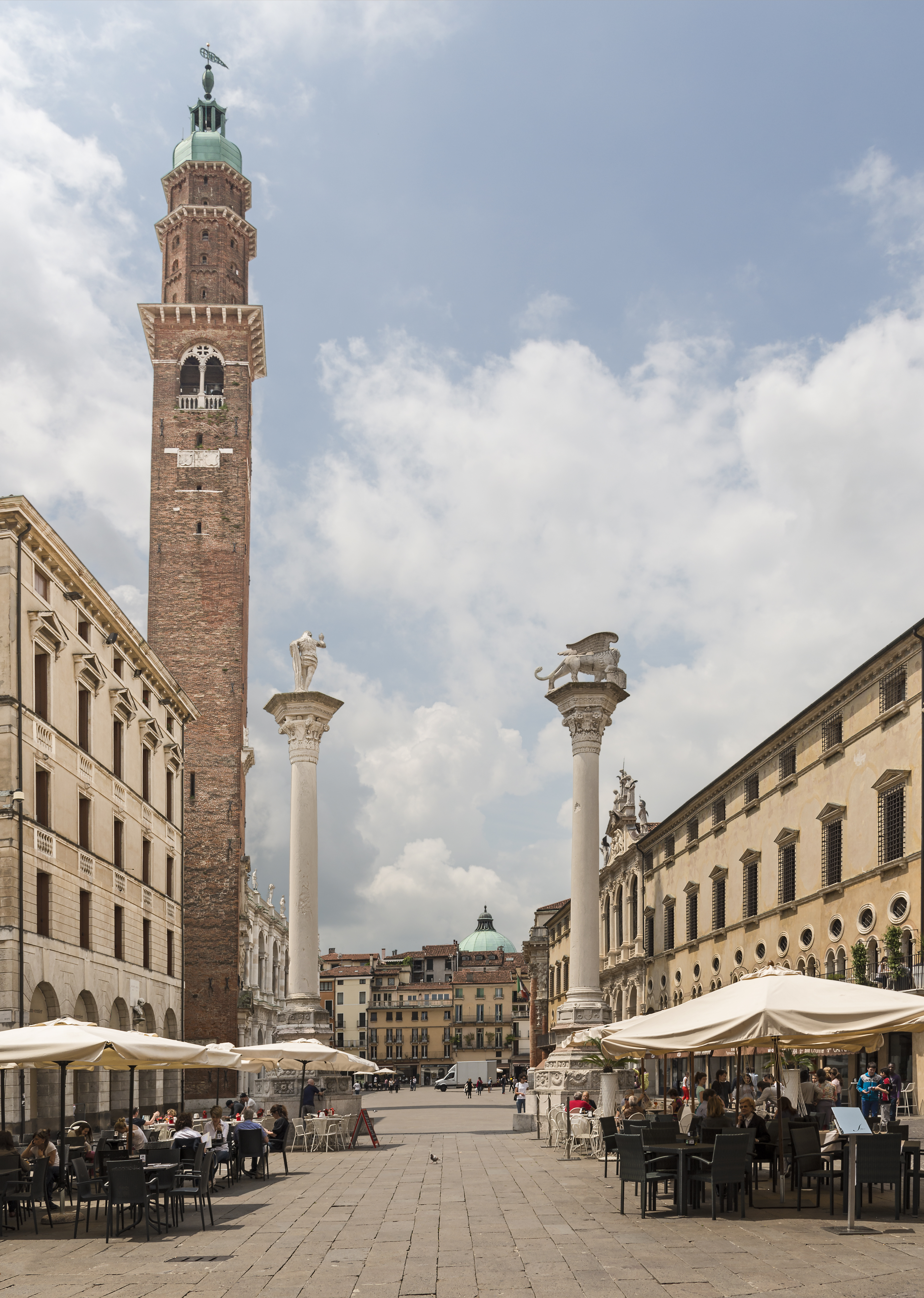
Torre Bissara

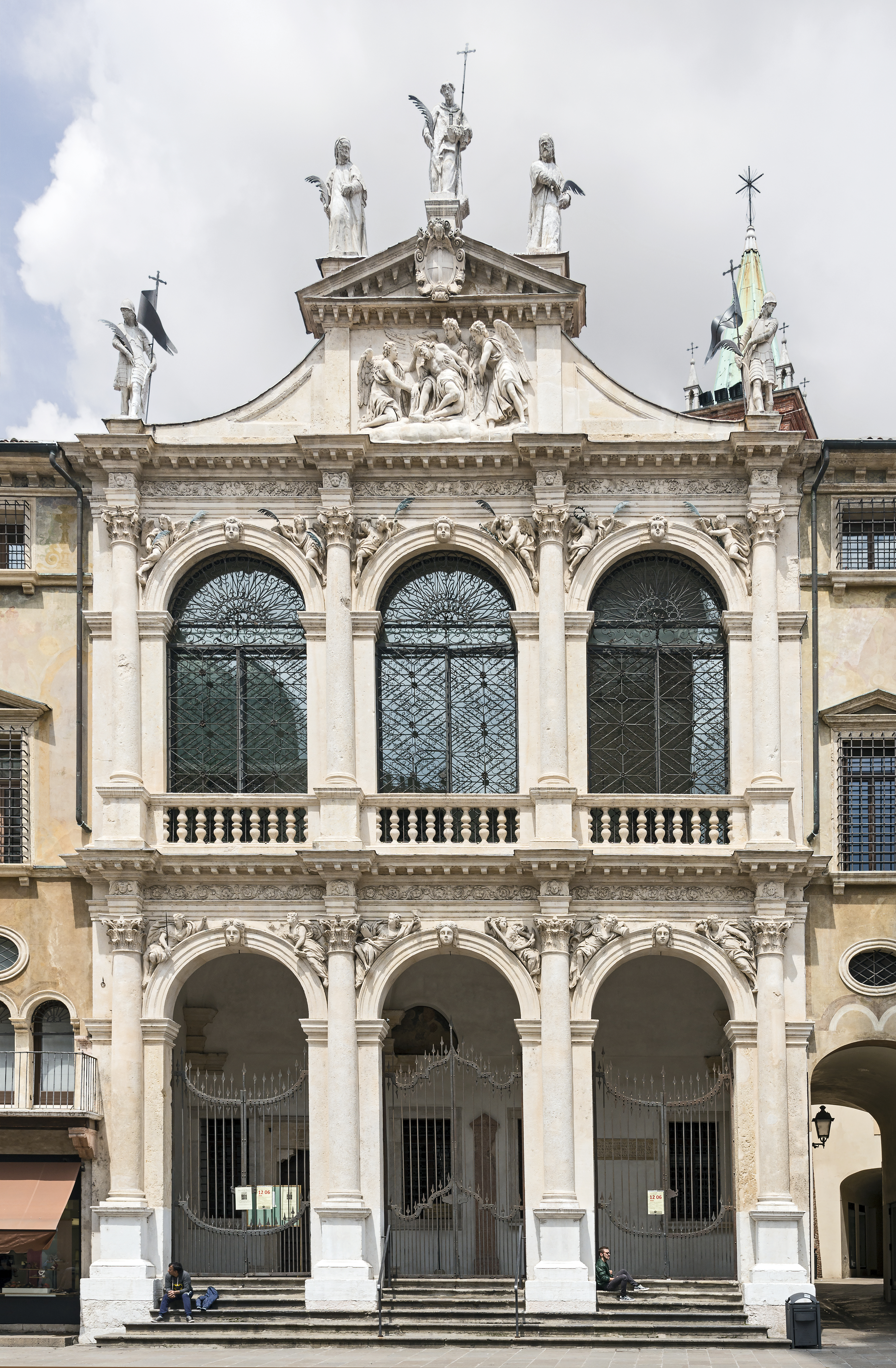
San Vincenzo

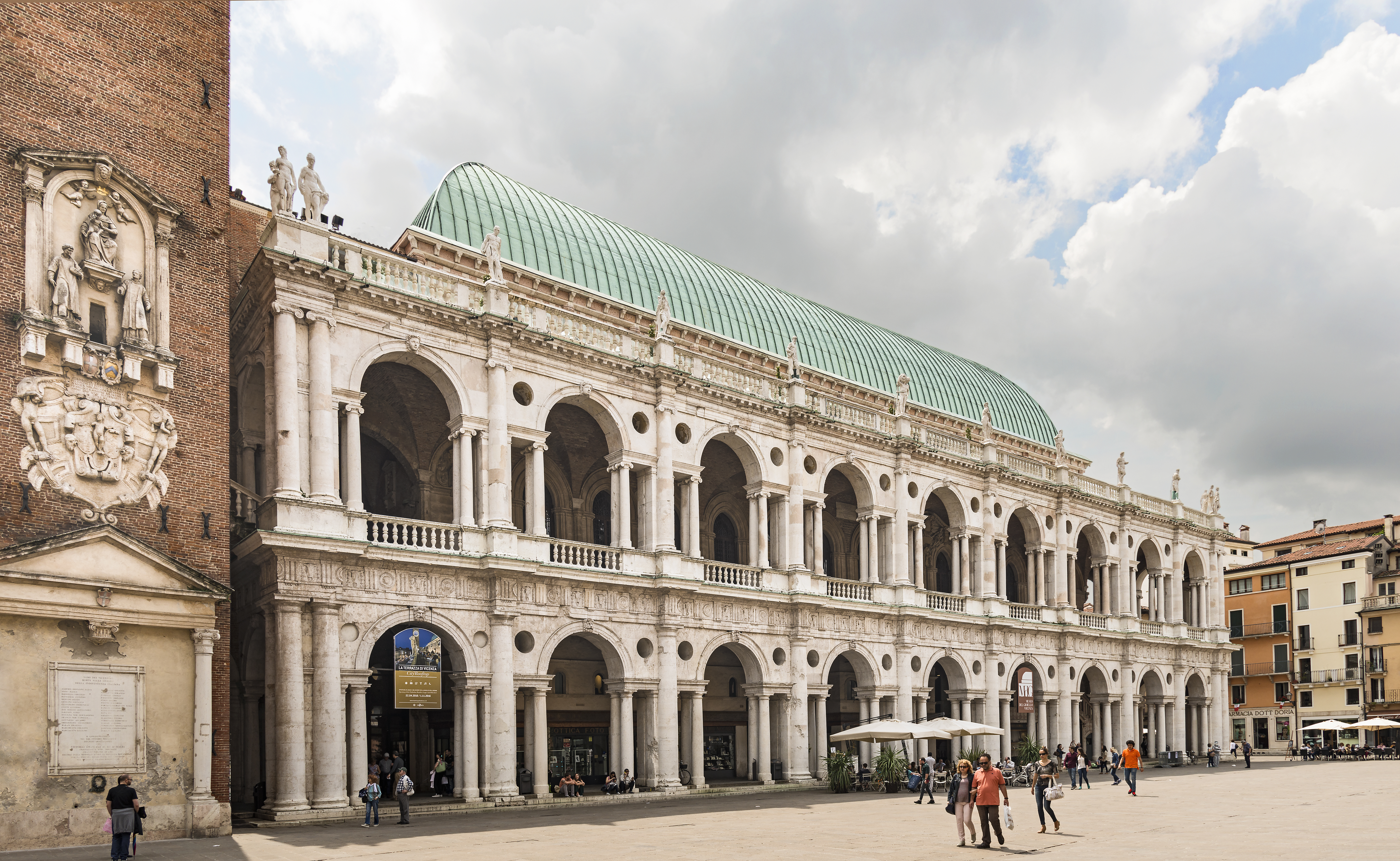
Basilica Palladiana

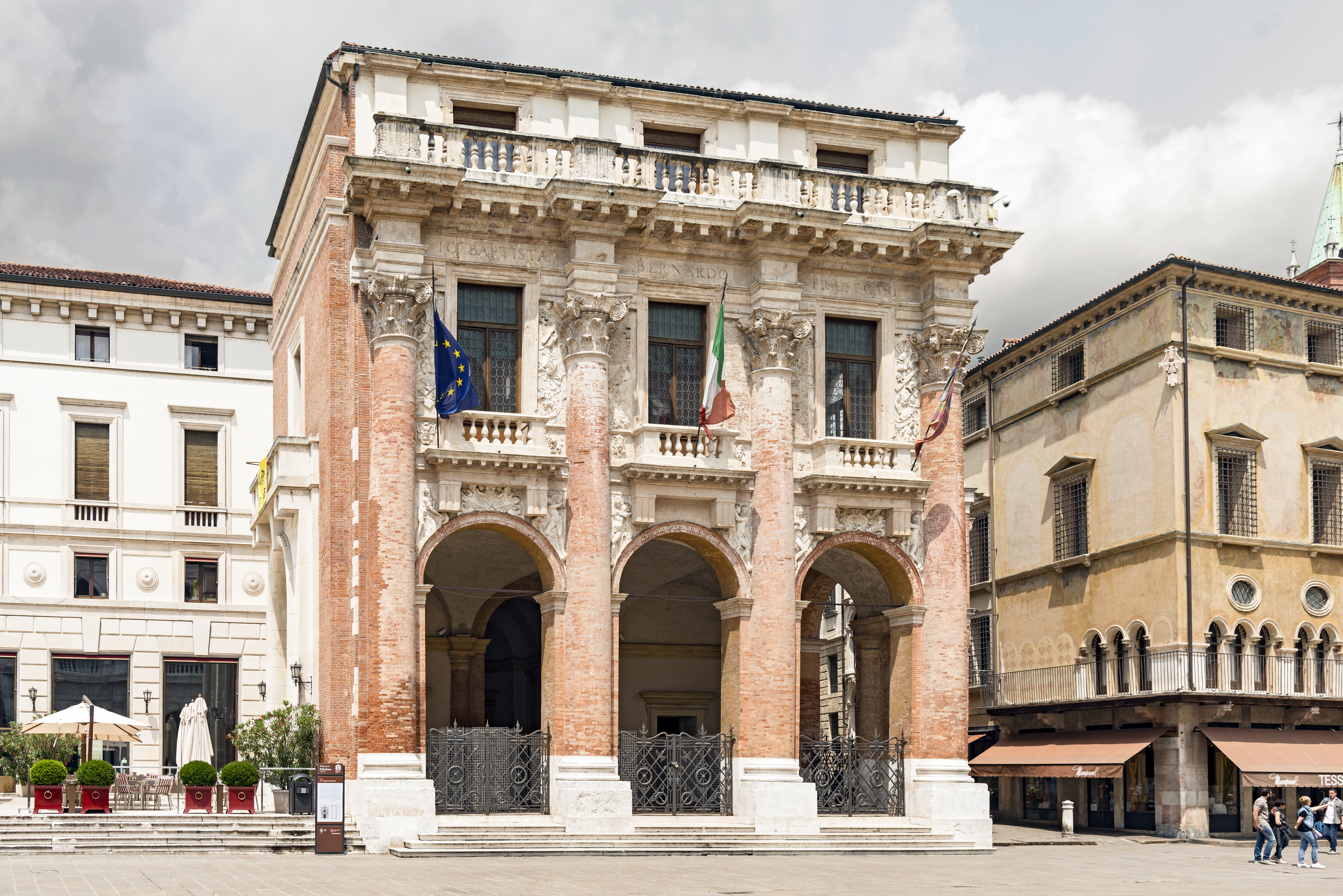
Palazzo del Capitanio

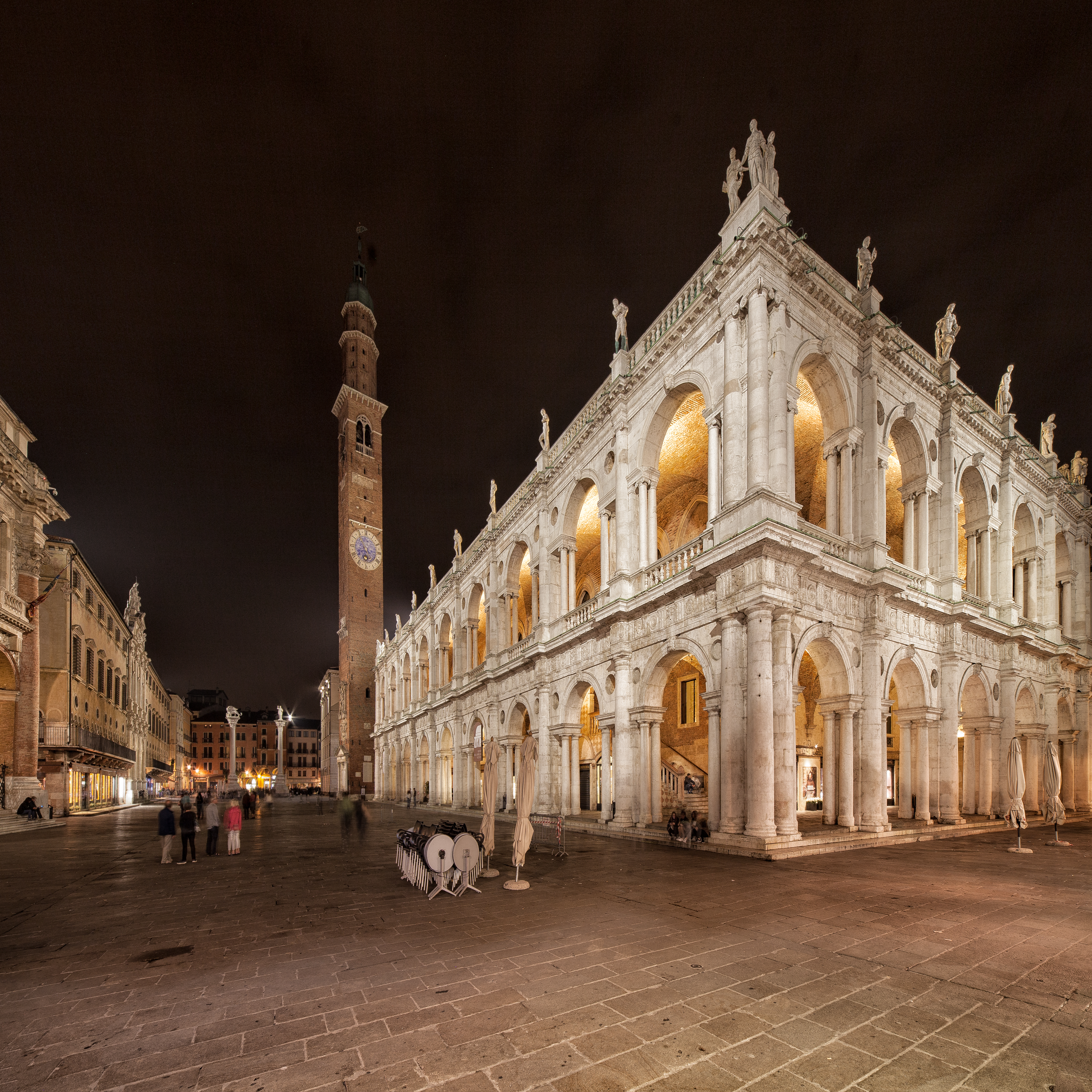
By night
