= Basilica Palladiana =

UNESCO World Heritage Site
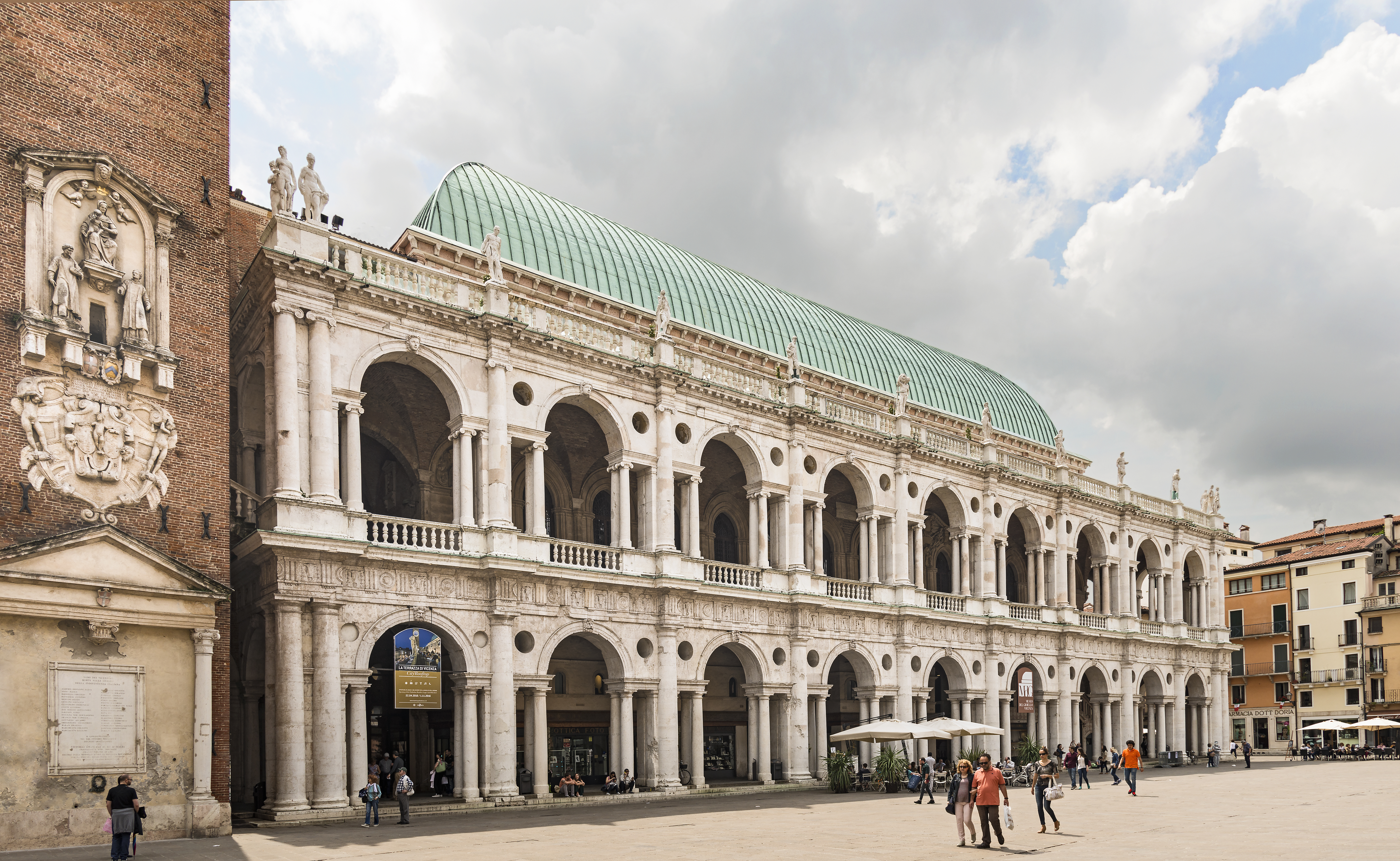
- Basilica Palladiana

- Location within Veneto Location within Italy
- Location: Vicenza, Veneto, Italy
- Part of: City of Vicenza and the Palladian Villas of the Veneto
- Criteria: Cultural: (i), (ii)
- Reference: 712bis-024
- Inscription: 1994 (18th Session)
- Extensions: 1996
- Area: 2.78 ha (6.9 acres)
- Coordinates: 45°32′49″N 11°32′48″E

The Basilica Palladiana is a Renaissance building in the central Piazza dei Signori in Vicenza, north-eastern Italy. The most notable feature of the edifice is the loggia, which shows one of the first examples of what have come to be known as the Palladian window, designed by a young Andrea Palladio, whose work in architecture was to have a significant effect on the field during the Renaissance and later periods.

Since 1994, the Basilica Palladiana, together with other Palladian buildings in and around Vicenza, has been part of the UNESCO World Heritage Site "City of Vicenza and the Palladian Villas of the Veneto".

== History ==
The building was originally constructed in the 15th century and was known as the Palazzo della Ragione, having been designed by Domenico da Venezia to include two pre-existing public palazzi. The building, which was in the Gothic style, served as the seat of government and also housed a number of shops on the ground floor. The 82-metre (269 ft)-tall Torre Bissara precedes this structure, as it is known from as early as 1172; however, its height was increased on this occasion, and its pinnacle was finished in 1444. It has five bells in the chord of E. The 15th-century edifice had an upside-down cover, partly supported by large archivolts, inspired by the one built in 1306 for the eponymous building of Padua. The Gothic façade was in red and gialletto marble of Verona, and is still visible behind the Palladio addition.

A double order of columns was built by Tommaso Formenton in 1481–1494 to surround the palace. However, two years after its completion, the south-western corner collapsed. In the following decades, the Vicentine government called in architects such as Antonio Rizzo, Giorgio Spavento, Antonio Scarpagnino, Jacopo Sansovino, Sebastiano Serlio, Michele Sanmicheli and Giulio Romano to propose a reconstruction plan. In 1546, the Council of One Hundred chose a 40-year-old local architect, Andrea Palladio, to reconstruct the building starting from April 1549. Palladio added a new outer shell of marble classical forms, a loggia and a portico that now obscure the original Gothic architecture. He also dubbed the building a "basilica", after the ancient Roman civil structures of that name.

The Basilica was an expensive project (some 60,000 ducats once finished) and took a long time to complete. Palladio received for the work an income of five ducats a month for most of his life. In 1614—thirty years after his death—the building was completed, with the finishing of the main façade on Piazza delle Erbe.

== Description ==
Drawings by Palladio, from his original proposal of 1546 to the final construction, have been preserved. His solution, which also encompasses the necessary measure to adapt the addition to the pre-existing structure, is based on the so-called serliana: this is a repetitive structure in which round arches are flanked by rectangular openings; the latter were of different size, in order to match the variable size of the internal bay. In the angular arcades, the architrave openings become very narrow. The serliana had been already used in the Veneto some years before by Jacopo Sansovino for his Biblioteca Marciana (1537), as well as in the reconstruction of the Polirone Abbey by Giulio Romano (1540).

The loggias in the lower floor were in the Doric order; the associated entablature has a frieze which alternates metope (decorated by dishes and bucrania) and triglyphs. The upper-floor loggias, by contrast, are in the Ionic order, with a continuous frieze entablature.

The parapet has statues by Giovanni Battista Albanese, Grazioli and Lorenzo Rubini. The clocktower has five bells in the chord of E major.

== Conservation ==
Since 1994 the Basilica has been protected as part of the World Heritage Site also including the other Palladian buildings of Vicenza. The building now often hosts exhibitions in its large hall used for civic events.

== Restoration ==
A large restoration project started in 2007. In 2014 it won the European Union Prize for Cultural Heritage / Europa Nostra Award.

== Gallery ==
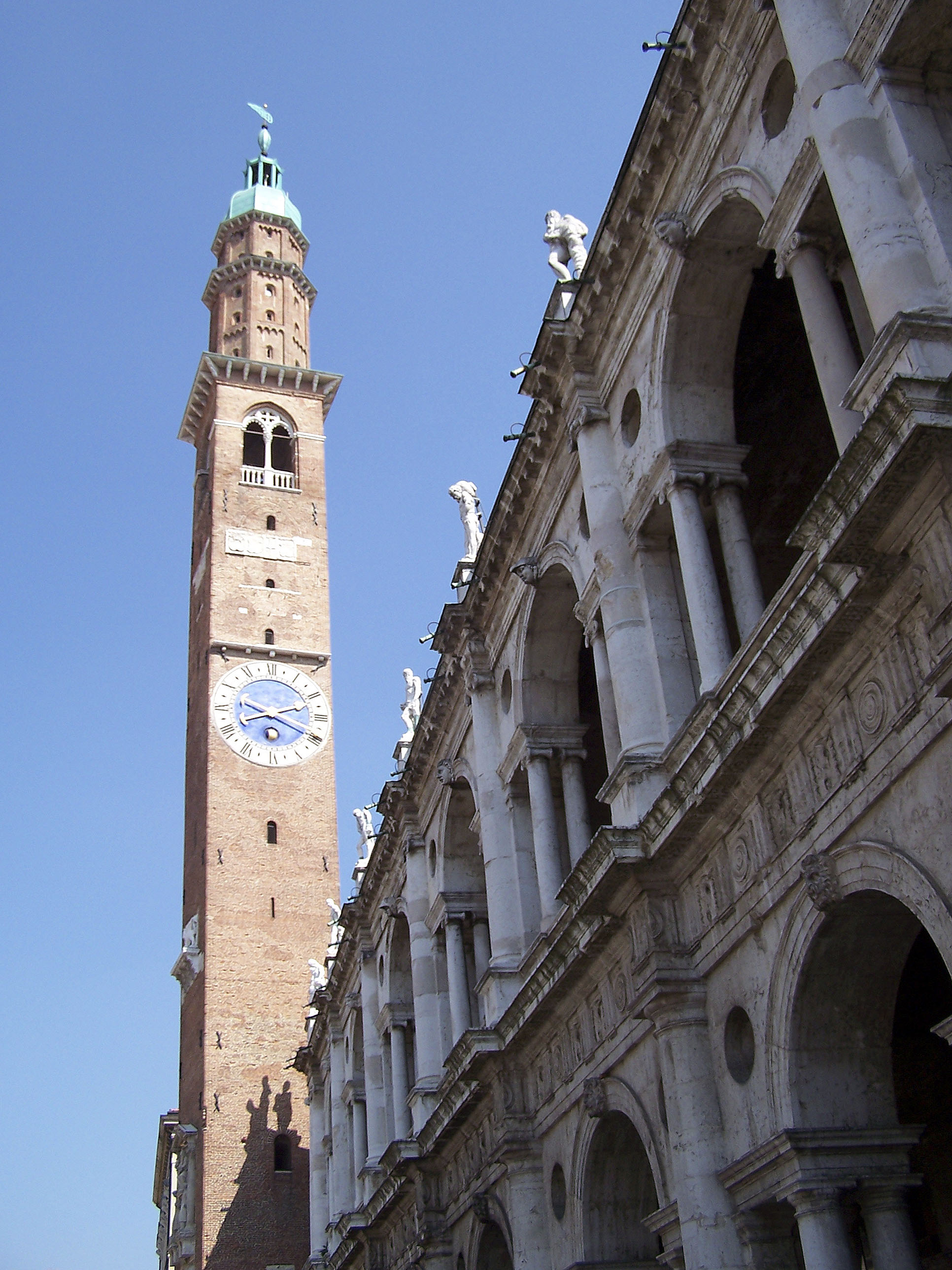
Clocktower (Torre Bissara) and loggia of the Basilica Palladiana

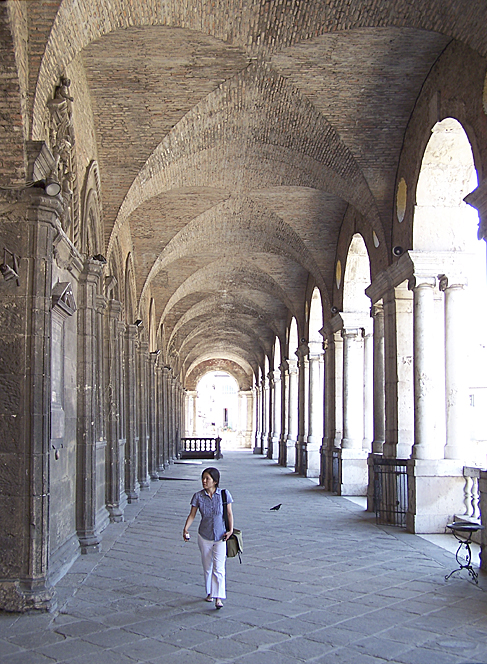
Upper level loggia

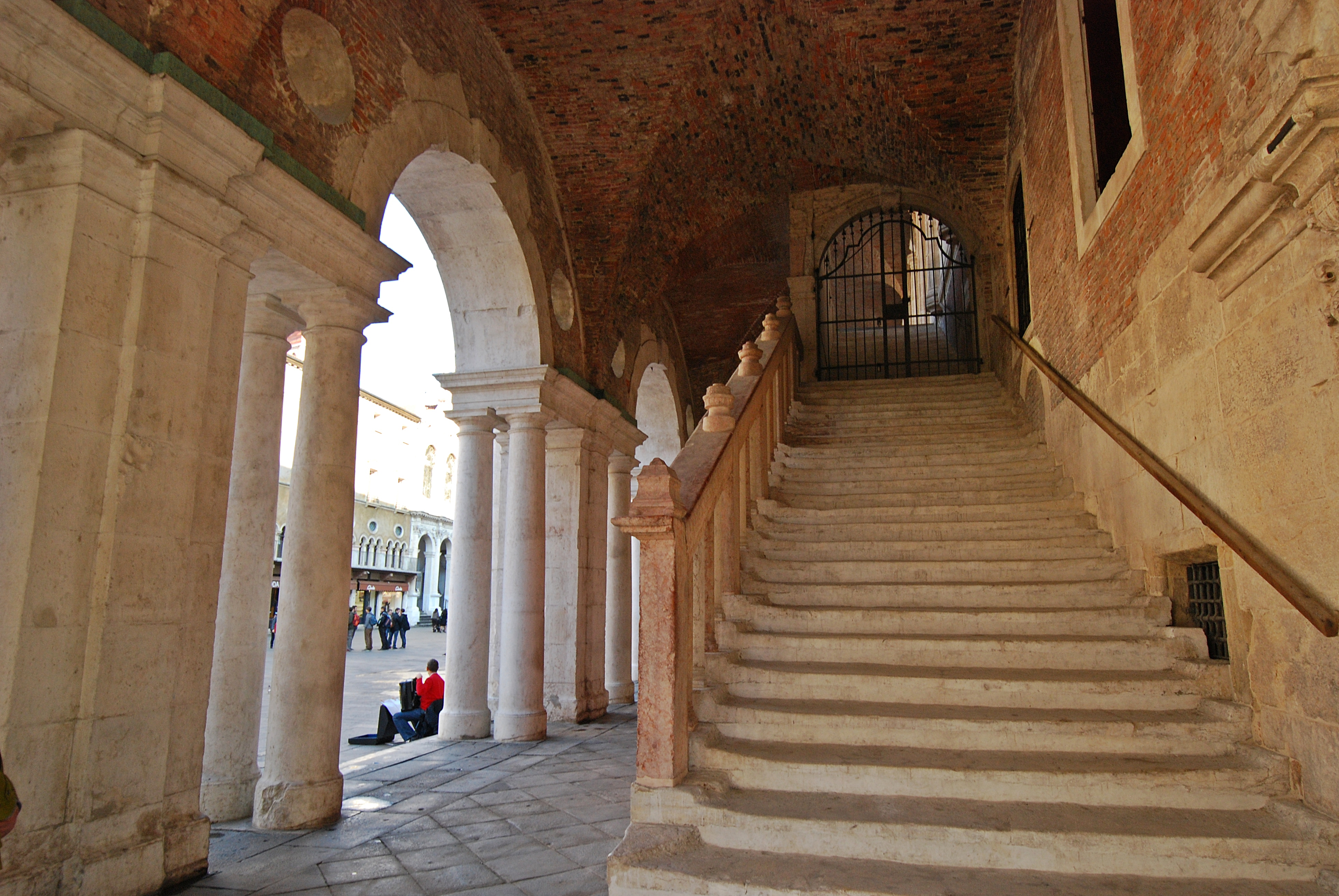
Ground floor

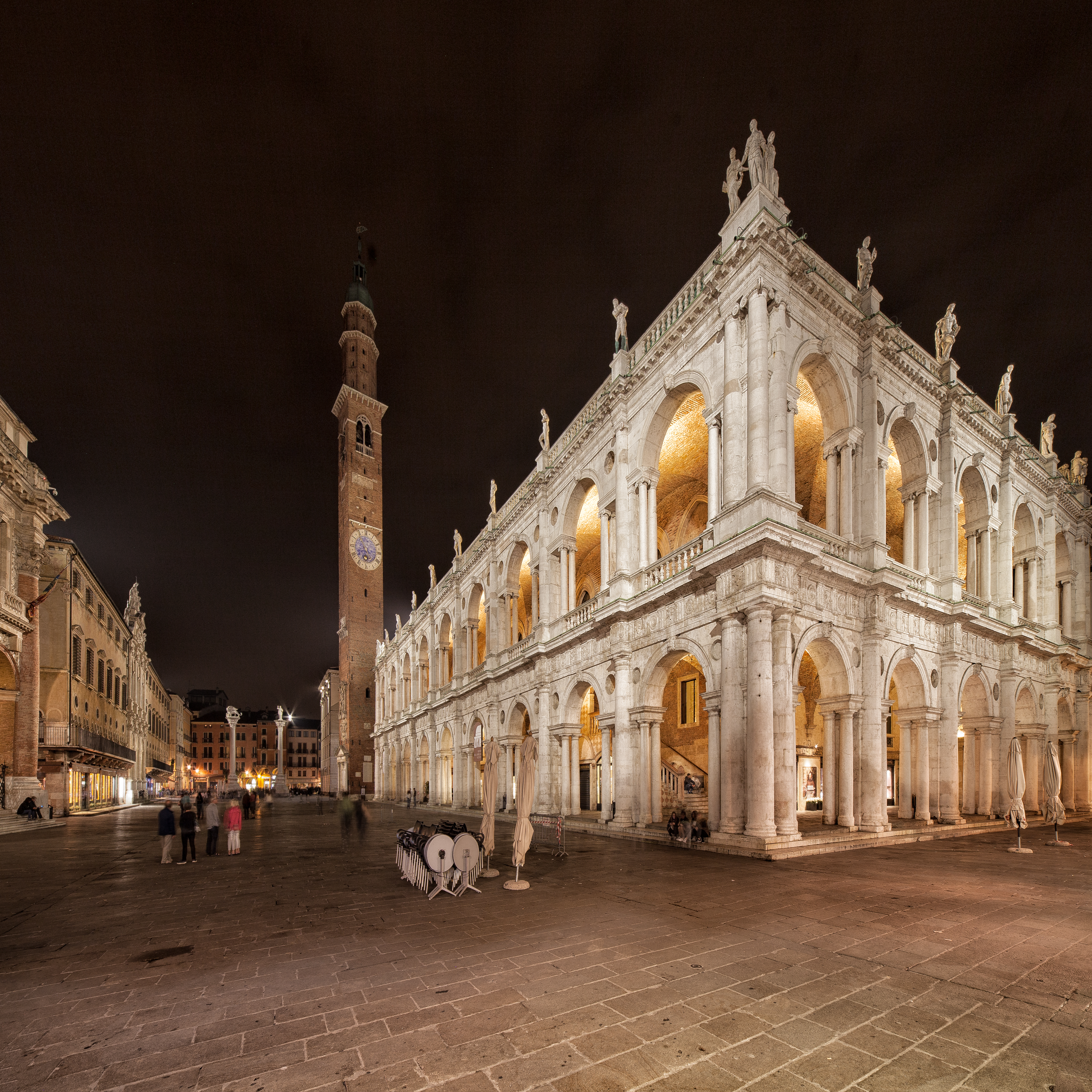
A night view of the Basilica Palladiana

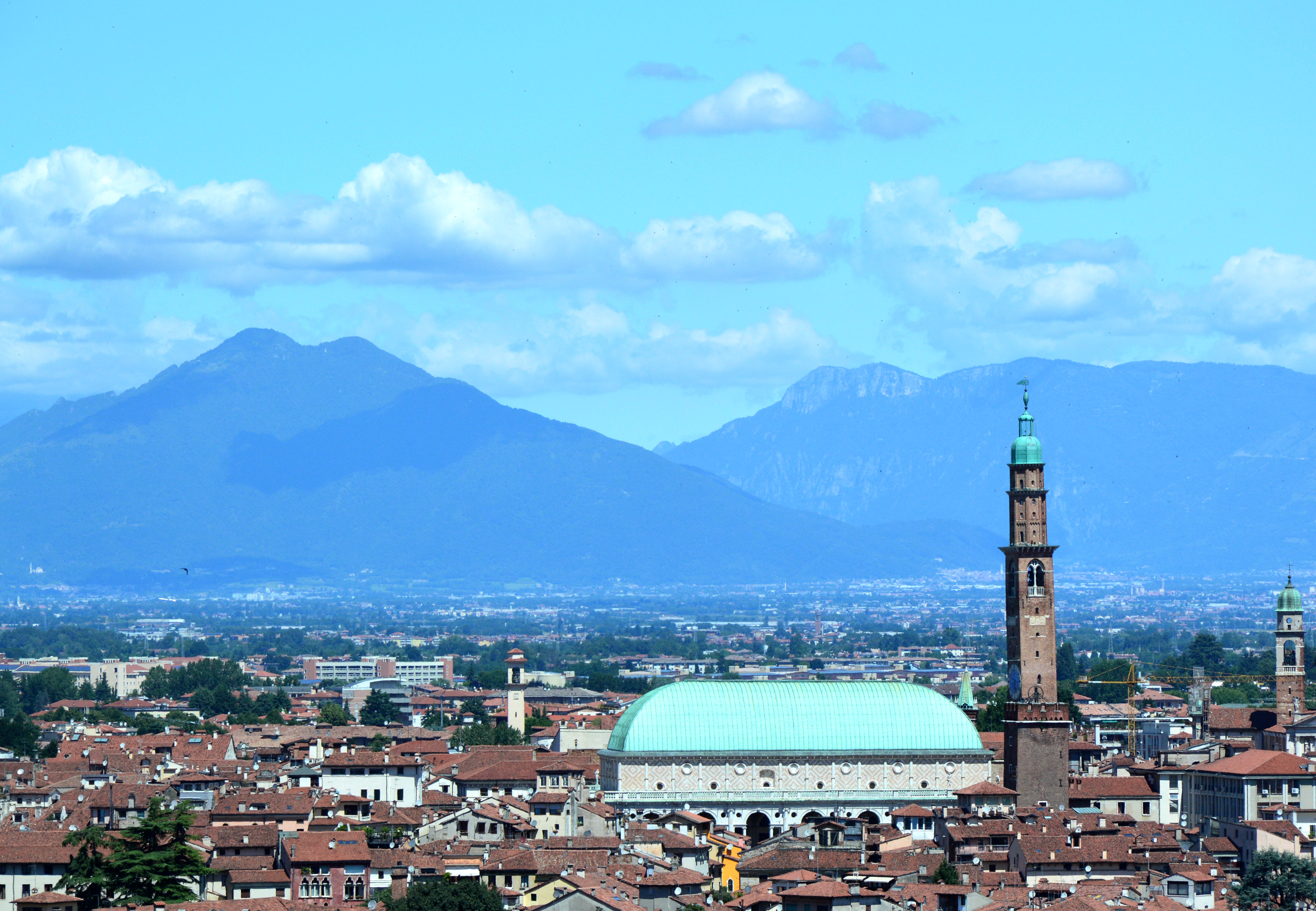
Basilica Palladiana, view from Monte Berico

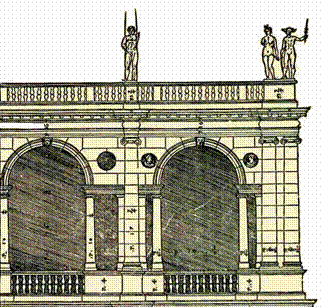
Detail of the upper loggia with two serliana (drawn from I quattro libri dell'architettura)
