= Francesco Maffei =

Italian painter (1605–1660)

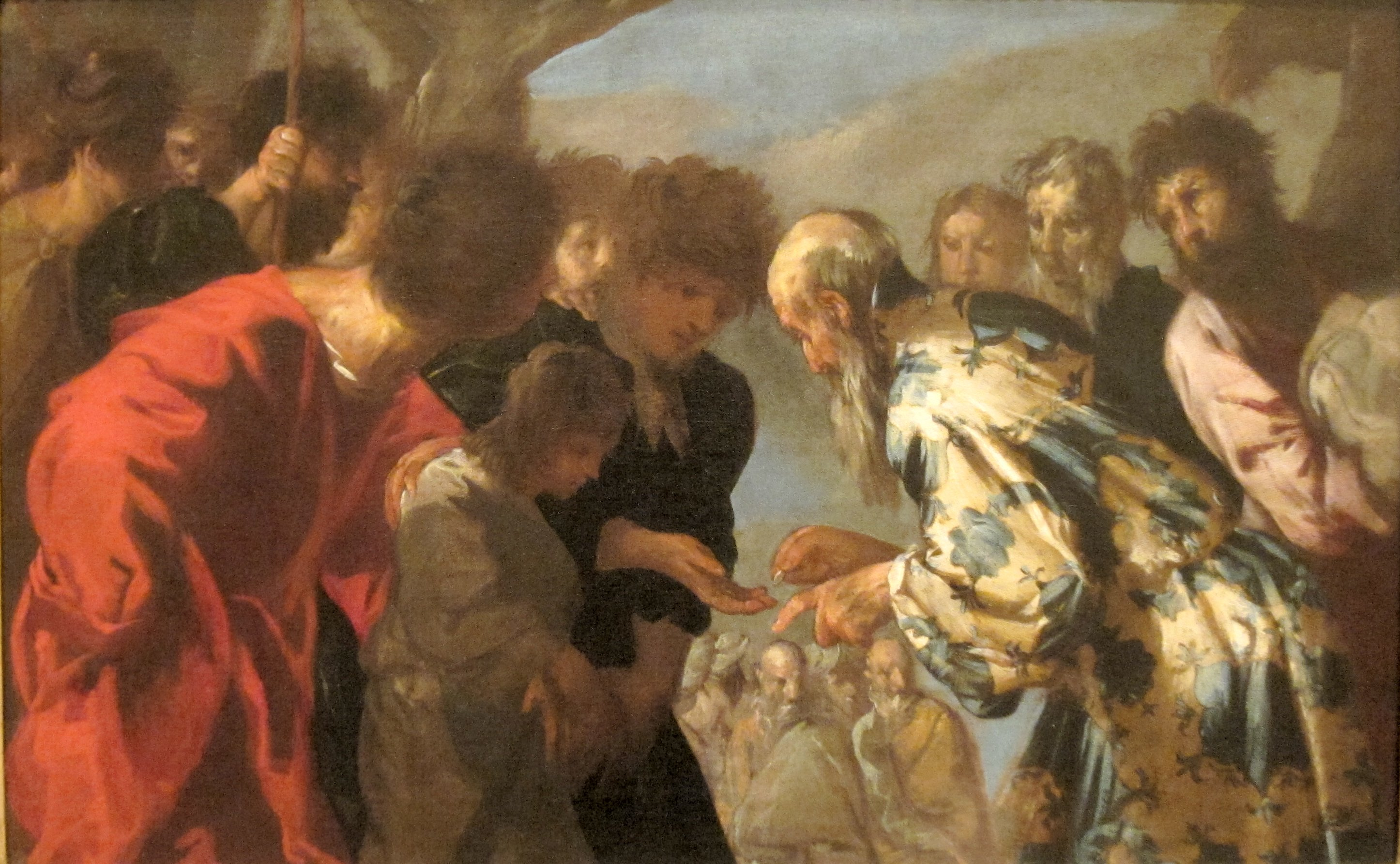
Joseph sold by his brothers into slavery

Francesco Maffei (1605 – 2 July 1660) was an Italian painter, active in the Baroque style.

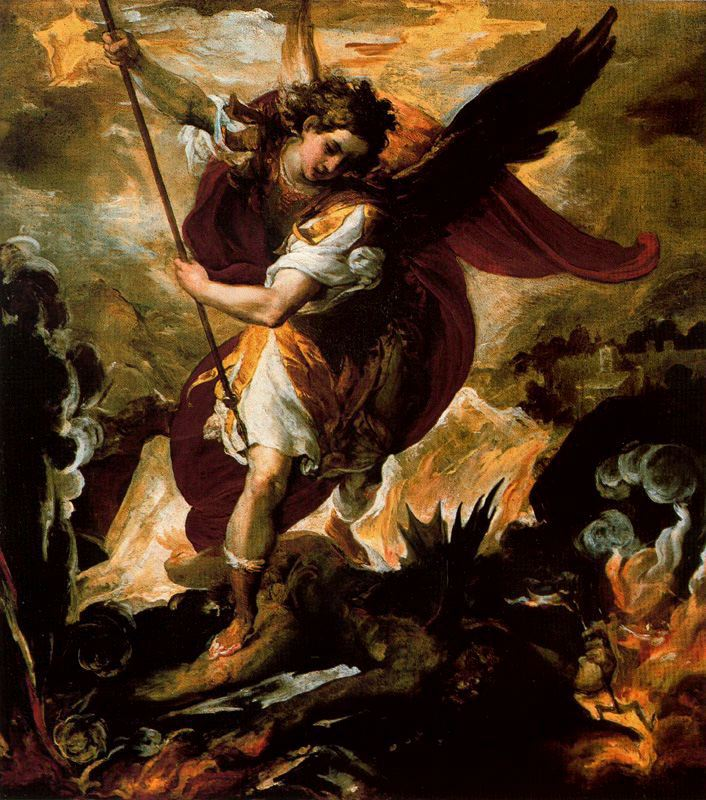
St Michael Archangel defeats Lucifer

== Biography ==
He probably trained in his birthplace of Vicenza with his father, and painted mostly in the towns of the Veneto (Venetian mainland). He died in Padua.

He is noted for his somewhat provincial stylistic quirks, combining the decorative manner of baroque with visual distortions and nervous brush strokes. His figures often glimmer with imprecise borders; a style which would characterize also the pittura de tocco e di macchia (painting of touch and dots) of the following decades and century. Representatives of this manner came from diverse regions of Europe, and worked in diverse styles, including Ricci, Carpioni, Magnasco, and later Francesco Guardi.

The canvases are often crowded with people and vigorous action (see War against the Fallen Angels at the Galleria Brera in Milan). He is known for paintings in Ca Rezzonico in Venice, the Palazzo del Podesta in Vicenza, and in the Church of Santa Maria del Soccorso (La Rotonda) in Rovigo (1644–55). He also painted in the Oratory of San Nicola da Tolentino in Vicenza. He was trained under the Mannerist painter, Alessandro Maganza, yet was influenced by a variety of painters, including Veronese, Jacopo Bassano, Tintoretto, and Magnasco. He is known to have traveled briefly to Venice in 1638, where he would have encountered the then brash new baroque painterly style of Liss, Strozzi, and Fetti. Maffei left Vicenza in 1657 and settled in Padua, where he died of the plague. He influenced a variety of painters, including Andrea Celesti (c1637-1711) and Antonio Bellucci (1654–1727), a mentor of Sebastiano Ricci.

== The Maffei family ==
The surname von Maffei or Maffei is a patronymic name, derived from the Germanic personal name Matthäus. The Maffei family is of ancient German origin and, more precisely, in the 8th century A.D. derived from the Germanic tribe of the Franks. In ancient times the Maffei family settled in Verona from Germany.

== Reception ==
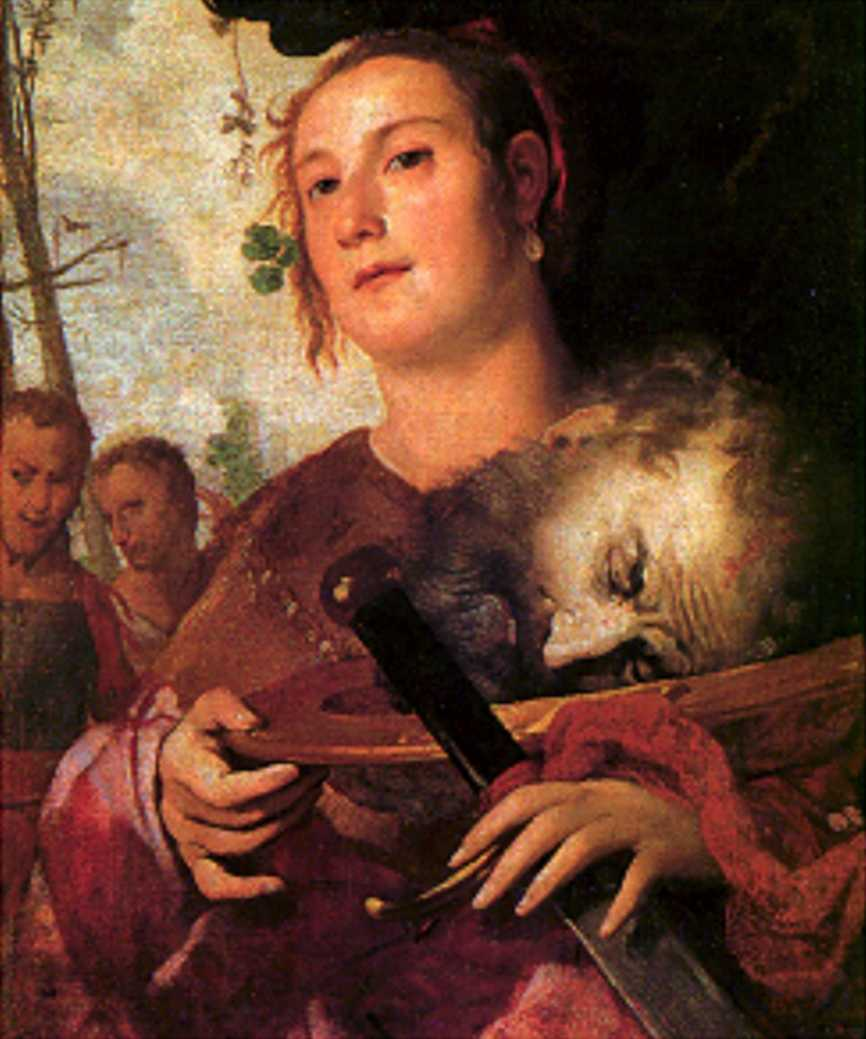
Erwin Panofsky explores the biblical allusions in this painting. Judith with the Head of Holofernes. (1650-1660)

Maffei's painting of a woman holding a sword and a head in a bowl was analysed by Erwin Panofsky. He suggested that it alludes to both the story of Judith and the story of Salome. However Panofsky concludes that the painting is of a certain "type", that there is precedent in Northern Italian of including the bowl of John in depictions of Judith. From this he argues for the use of historical pictorial traditions as evidence for interpreting painting.

== Sources ==
- Wittkower, Rudolf (1993). "Art and Architecture in Italy, 1600-1750". Pelican History of Art. 1980. Penguin Books Ltd. pp. 328, 330.
- Web Gallery Art biography
- Loire, Stéphane (1993). "Pietro Della Vecchia and the Heritage of the Renaissance in Venice by Bernard Aikema; Francesco Maffei by Paola Rossi". The Burlington Magazine. 135 (1082): 358–9. ISSN 0007-6287. JSTOR 885642.

== Gallery ==
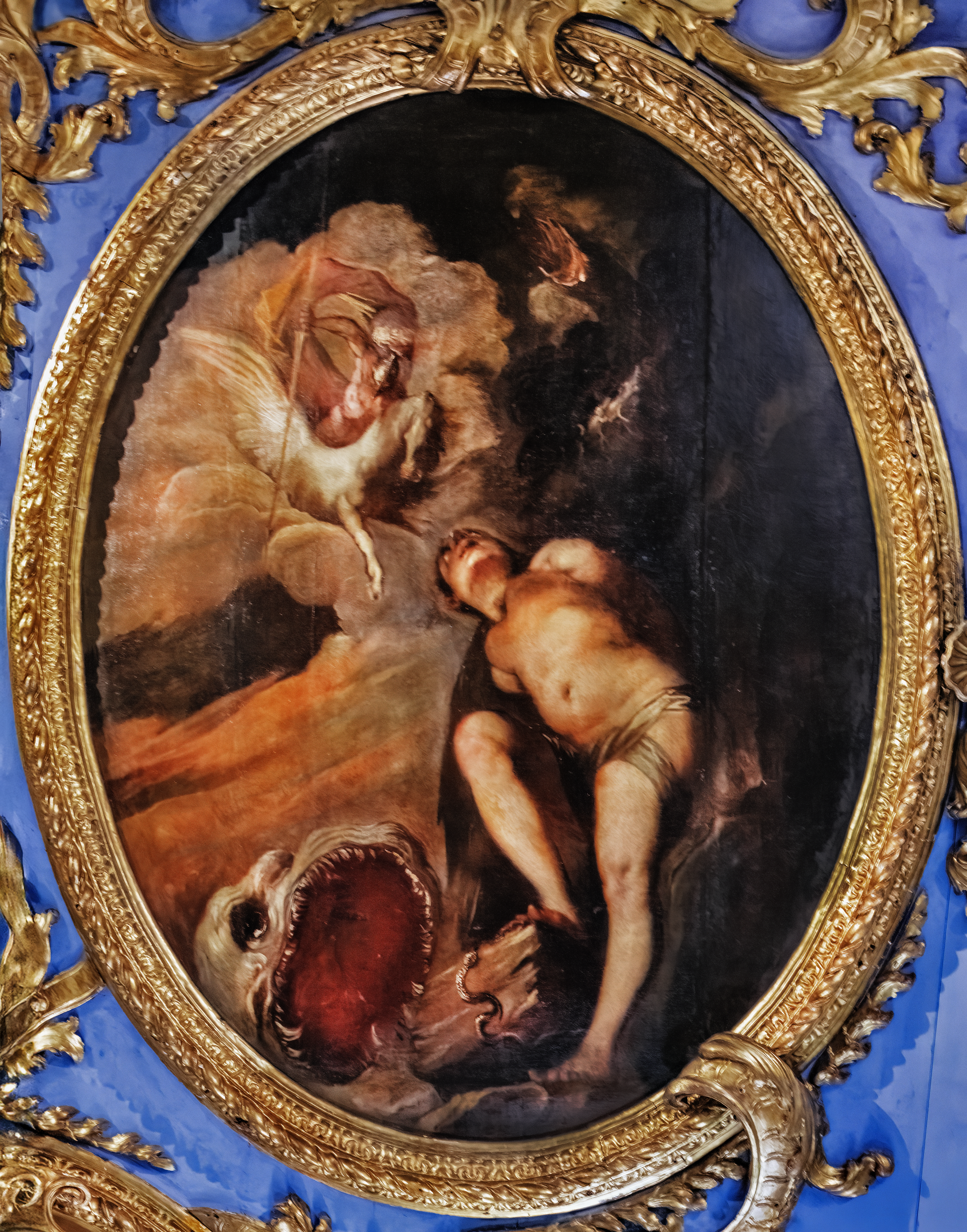
Perseus Frees Andromeda

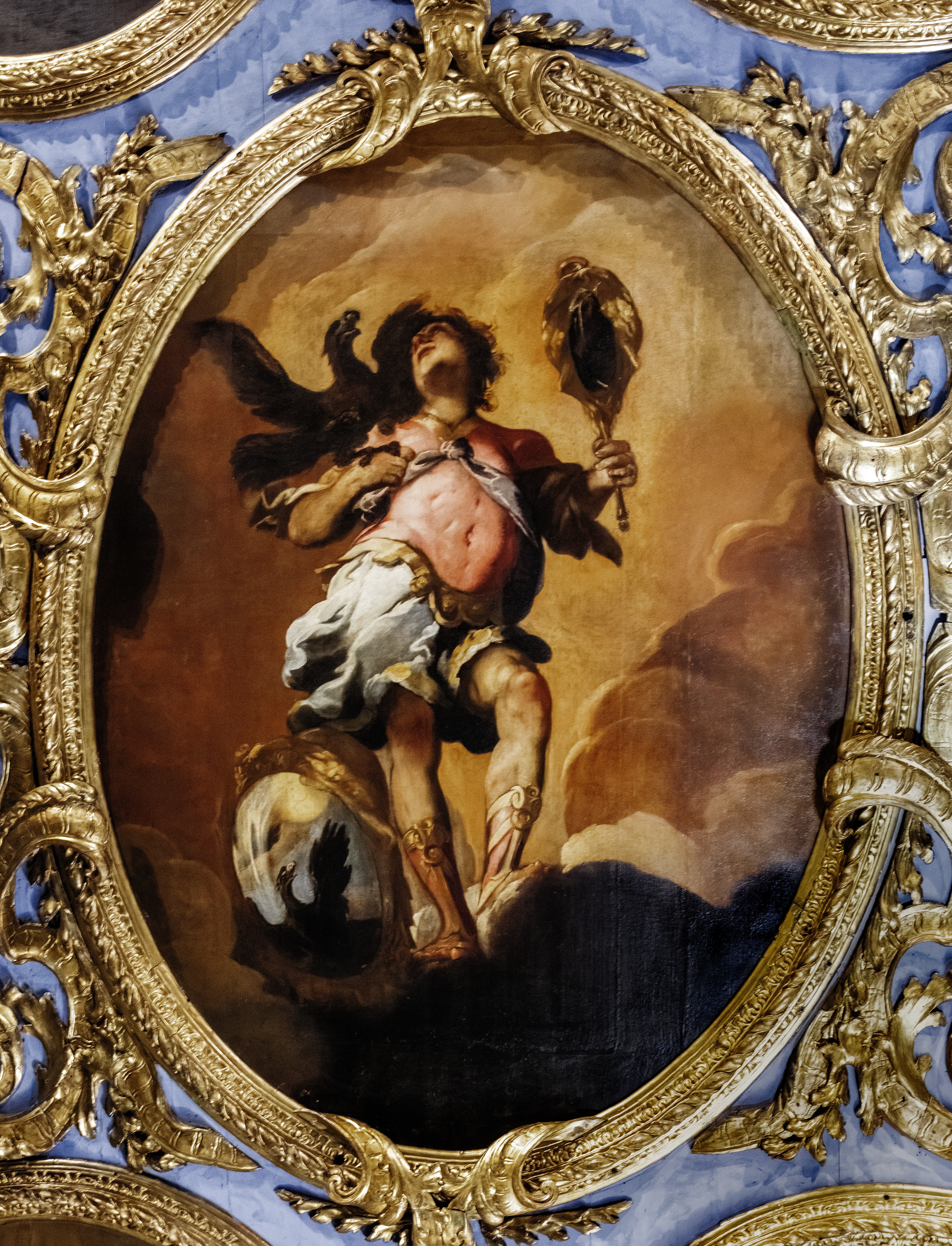
Prometheus with the Mirror and the Eagle

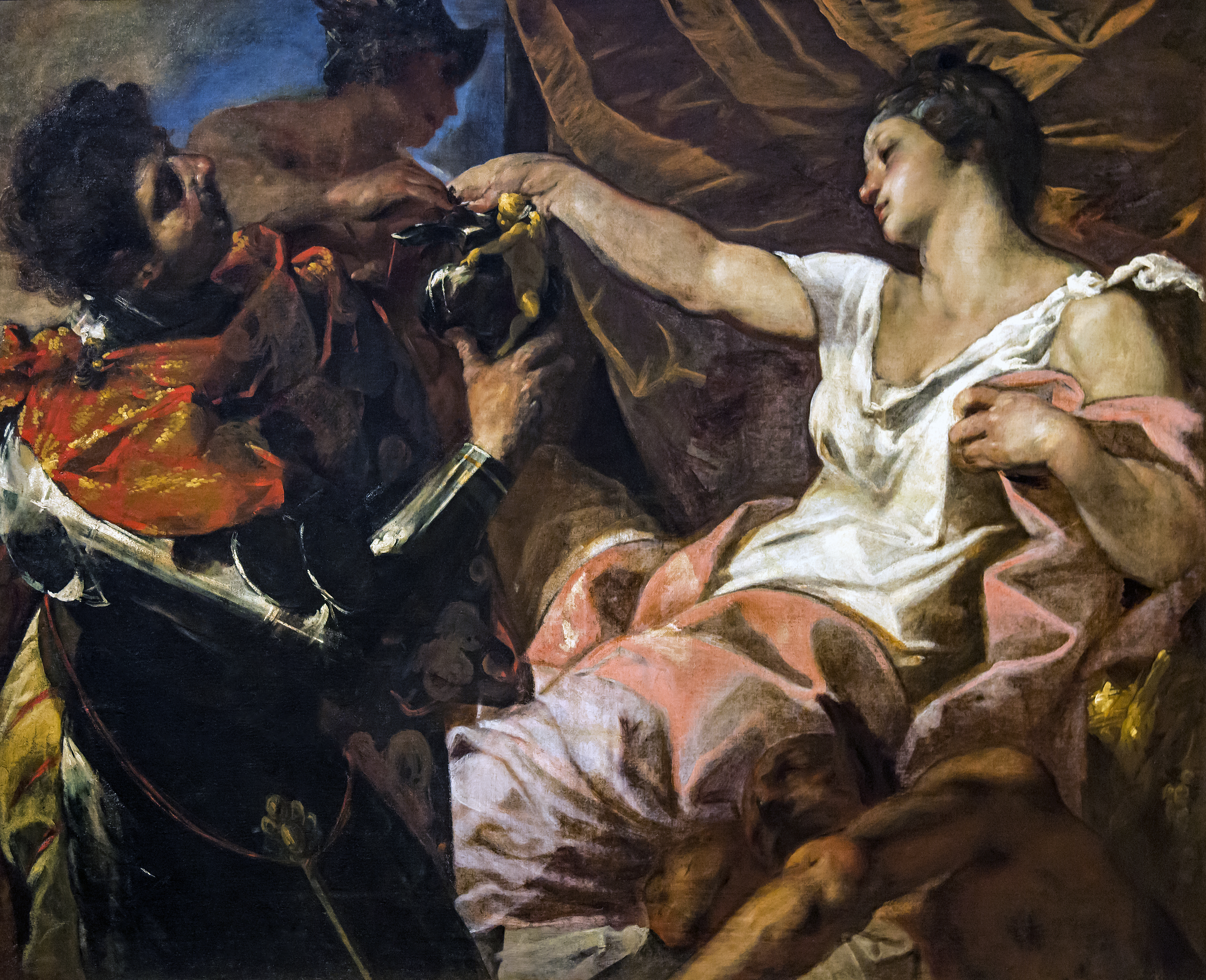
Mythological Scene

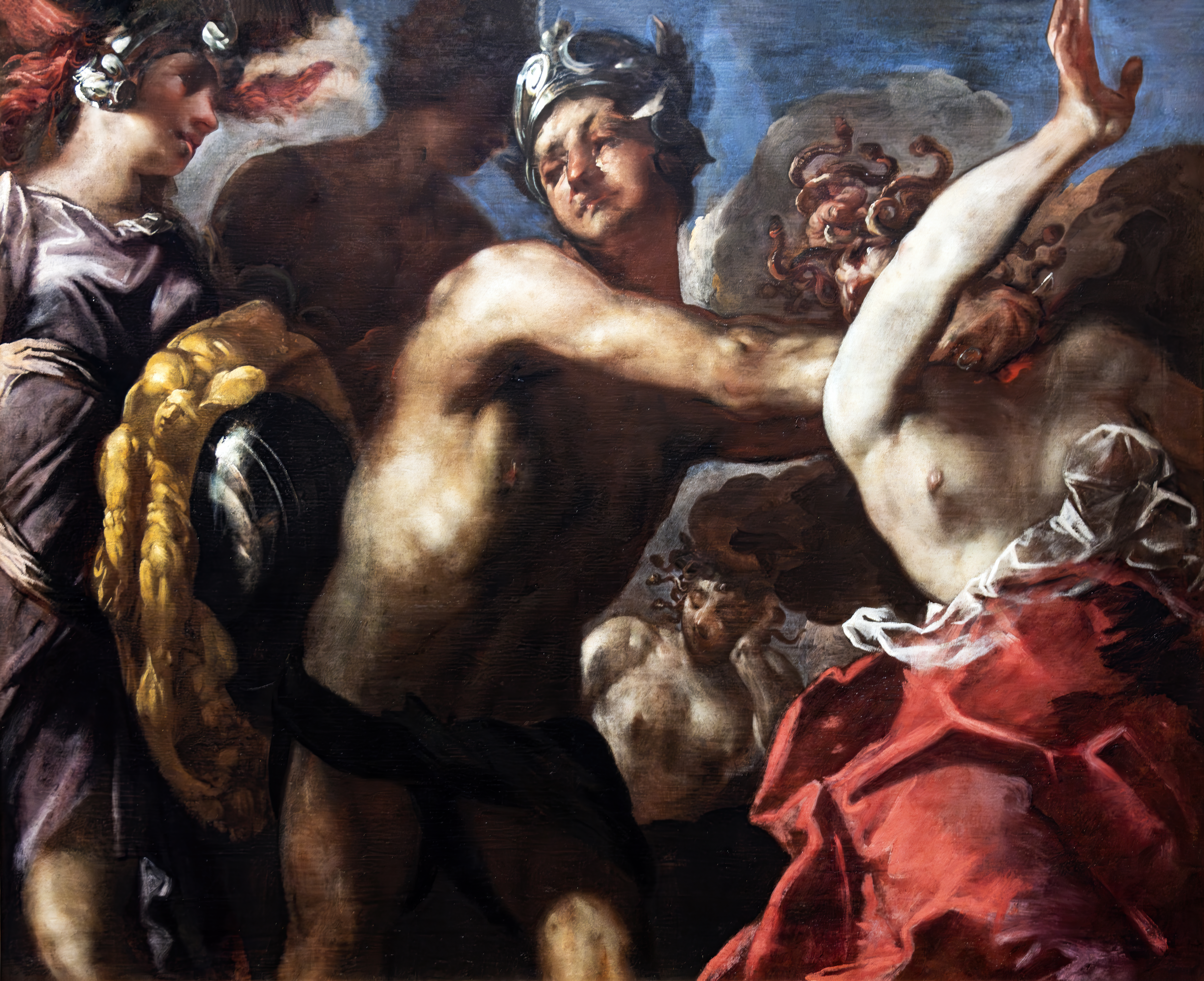
Perseus and Medusa
