= Alessandro Magnasco =

Italian painter (1667–1749)

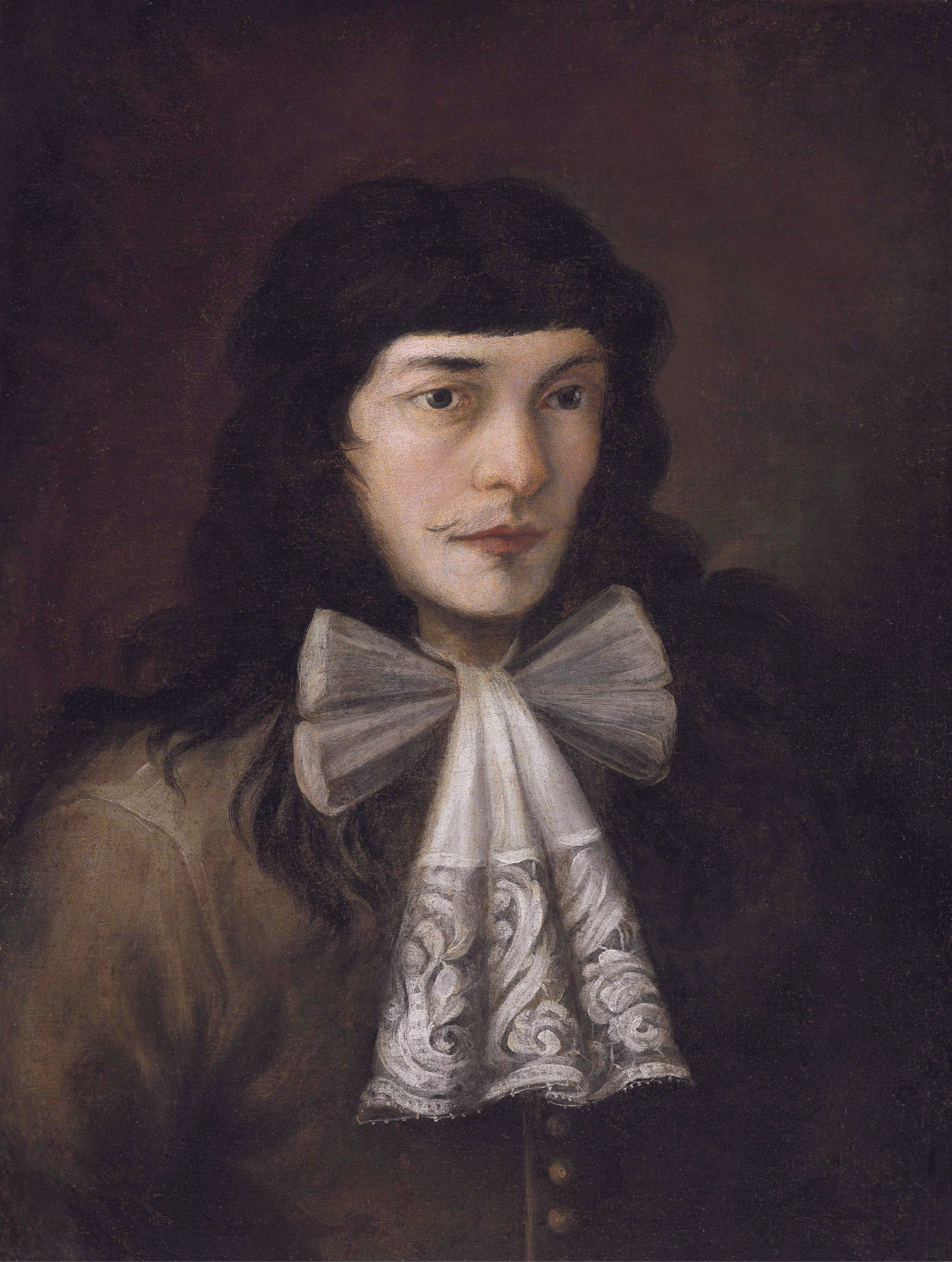
- Self-portrait
- Born: February 4, 1667; Genoa, Republic of Genoa
- Died: March 12, 1749 (aged 82); Genoa, Republic of Genoa
- Education: Valerio Castello, Filippo Abbiati
- Known for: Painting
- Movement: Baroque

Alessandro Magnasco (February 4, 1667 – March 12, 1749), also known as il Lissandrino, was an Italian late-Baroque painter active mostly in Milan and Genoa. He is best known for stylized, fantastic, often phantasmagoric genre or landscape scenes. Magnasco's distinctive style is characterized by fragmented forms rendered with swift brushstrokes and darting flashes of light.

== Life ==
Born in Genoa to a minor artist, Stefano Magnasco, he apprenticed with Valerio Castello, and finally with Filippo Abbiati (1640–1715) in Milan. Except for 1703–09 (or 1709–11) when working in Florence for the Grand Duke Cosimo III, Magnasco labored in Milan until 1735, when he returned to his native Genoa. Magnasco often collaborated with placing figures in the landscapes of Tavella and the ruins of Clemente Spera in Milan.

== Mature style ==
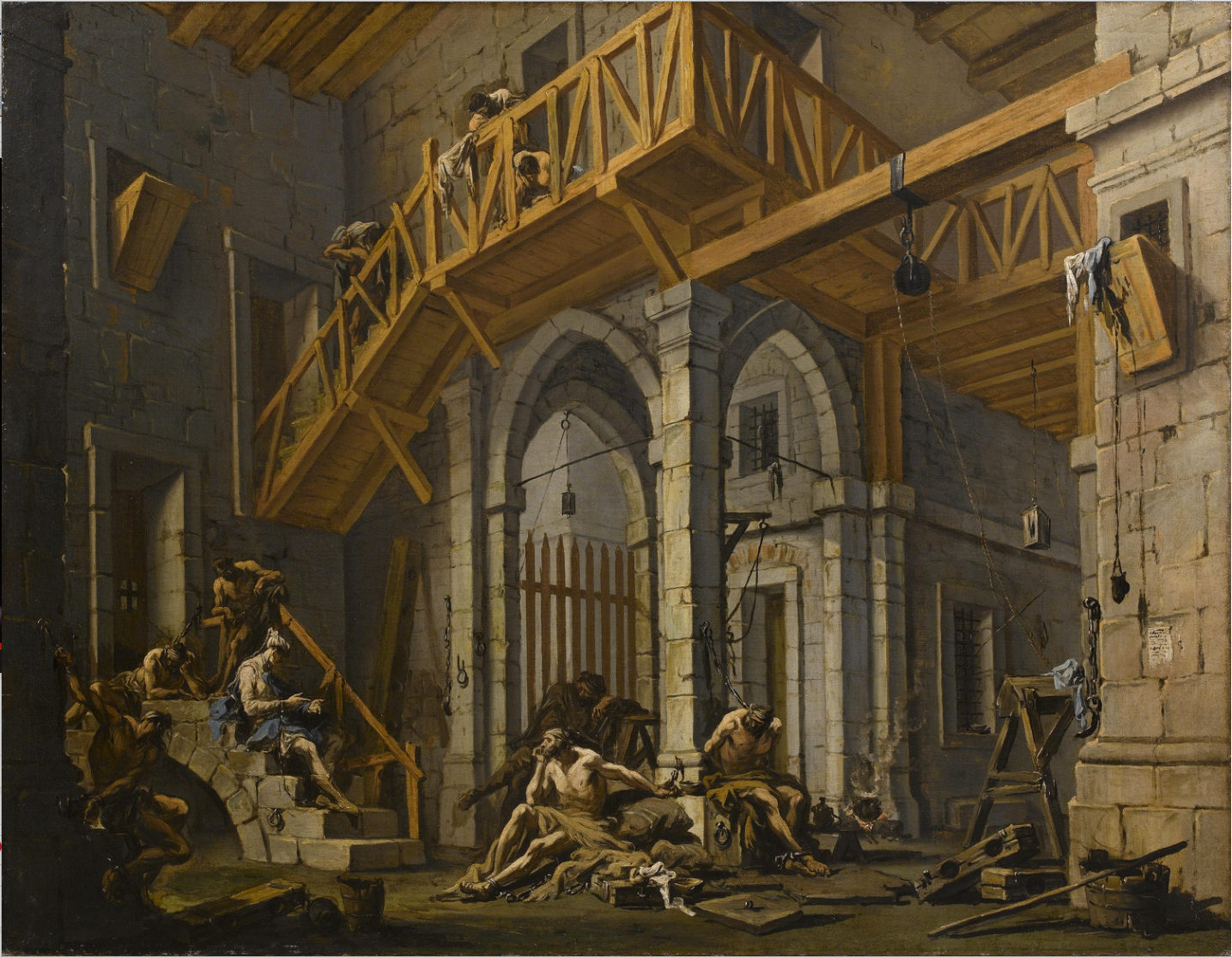
Joseph Interpreting Dreams

After 1710, Magnasco excelled in producing small, hypochromatic canvases with eerie and gloomy landscapes and ruins, or crowded interiors peopled with small, often lambent and cartoonishly elongated characters. The people in his paintings were often nearly liquefacted beggars dressed in tatters, rendered in flickering, nervous brushstrokes. Often they deal with unusual subjects such as synagogue services, Quaker meetings, robbers' gatherings, catastrophes, and interrogations by the Inquisition. His sentiments regarding these subjects are generally unclear.

A century later he would be described as a "romantic painter: who painted with candid touches, and ingenious expressiveness, little figures in Gothic churches; or in solitude, hermits and monks; or scoundrels assembled in town squares; soldiers in barracks". The art historian and critic Luigi Lanzi described him as the Cerquozzi of his school; thereby signaling him into the circle of followers of the Bamboccianti. He indicates that Magnasco had "figures scarcely more than a span large ... painted with humor and delight", but not as if this effect had been the intention of the painter. Lanzi says these eccentric pieces were favored by the Grand Duke Giovanni Gastone Medici of Florence. Magnasco also found contemporary patronage for his work among prominent families and collectors of Milan, for example the Arese and Casnedi families. This series of patrons underscores the fact that Magnasco was more esteemed by outsiders than by his fellow Genoese; as Lanzi noted, "his bold touch, though joined to a noble conception and to correct drawing, did not attract in Genoa, because it is far removed from the finish and union of tints which (Genoese) masters followed." In the twentieth century, Rudolf Wittkower derided him as "solitary, tense, strange, mystic, ecstatic, grotesque, and out of touch with the triumphal course of the Venetian school" from 1710 onward.

== Origins of his style ==
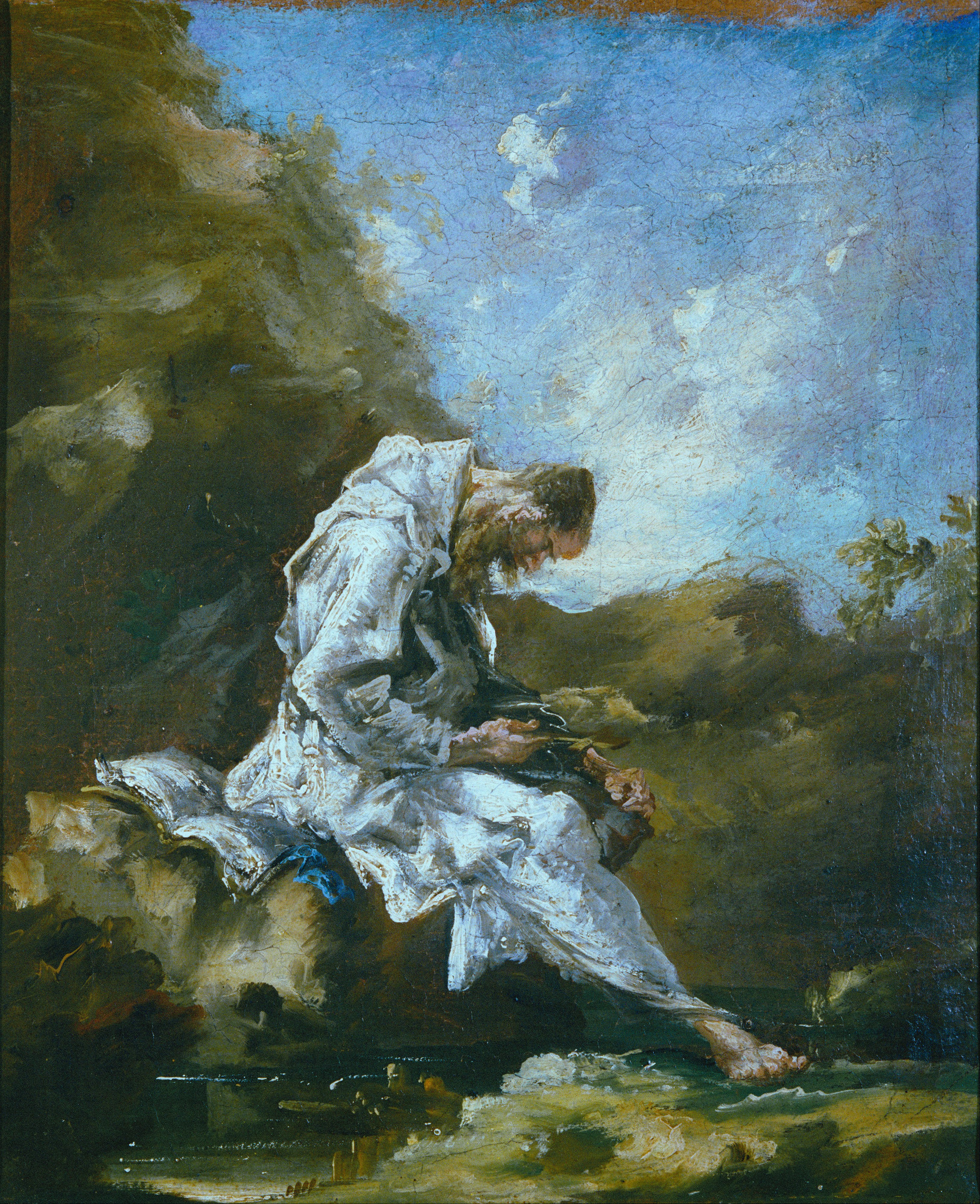
Hermit in the Desert

The influences on his work are obscure. Some suspect the influence of the loose painterly style of his Venetian contemporary Sebastiano Ricci (1659–1734), the Genoese Domenico Piola (1627–1703) and Gregorio de Ferrari, although the most prominent of the three, Ricci, painted in a more monumental and mythic style, and these artists may in fact have been influenced by Magnasco. Magnasco was likely influenced by Milanese il Morazzone (1573–1626) in the emotional quality of his work. Some of his canvases (see ill. (q.)) recall Salvator Rosa's romantic sea-lashed landscapes, and his affinity for paintings of brigands. The diminutive scale of Magnasco's figures relative to the landscape is comparable to Claude Lorrain's more airy depictions. While his use of figures of ragged beggars has been compared with Giuseppe Maria Crespi's genre style, Crespi's figures are larger, more distinct, and individual, and it is possible that Crespi himself may have influenced Magnasco. Others point to the influences of late Baroque Italian genre painters, the Roman Bamboccianti, and in his exotic scenography, the well-disseminated engravings of the Frenchman Callot.

== Legacy ==
Magnasco's work may have influenced Marco Ricci, Giuseppe Bazzani, Francesco Maffei, and the famed painters de tocco (by touch) Gianantonio and Francesco Guardi in Venice.

His depictions of torture in The Inquisition (or perhaps named Interrogations in a Jail) are an atypical subject for Italian baroque paintings, as were his depictions of the religious ceremonies of Jews and Quakers. Yet it remains unsolved, according to Wittkower, "how much quietism or criticism or farce went into the making of his pictures".

== Selected works ==
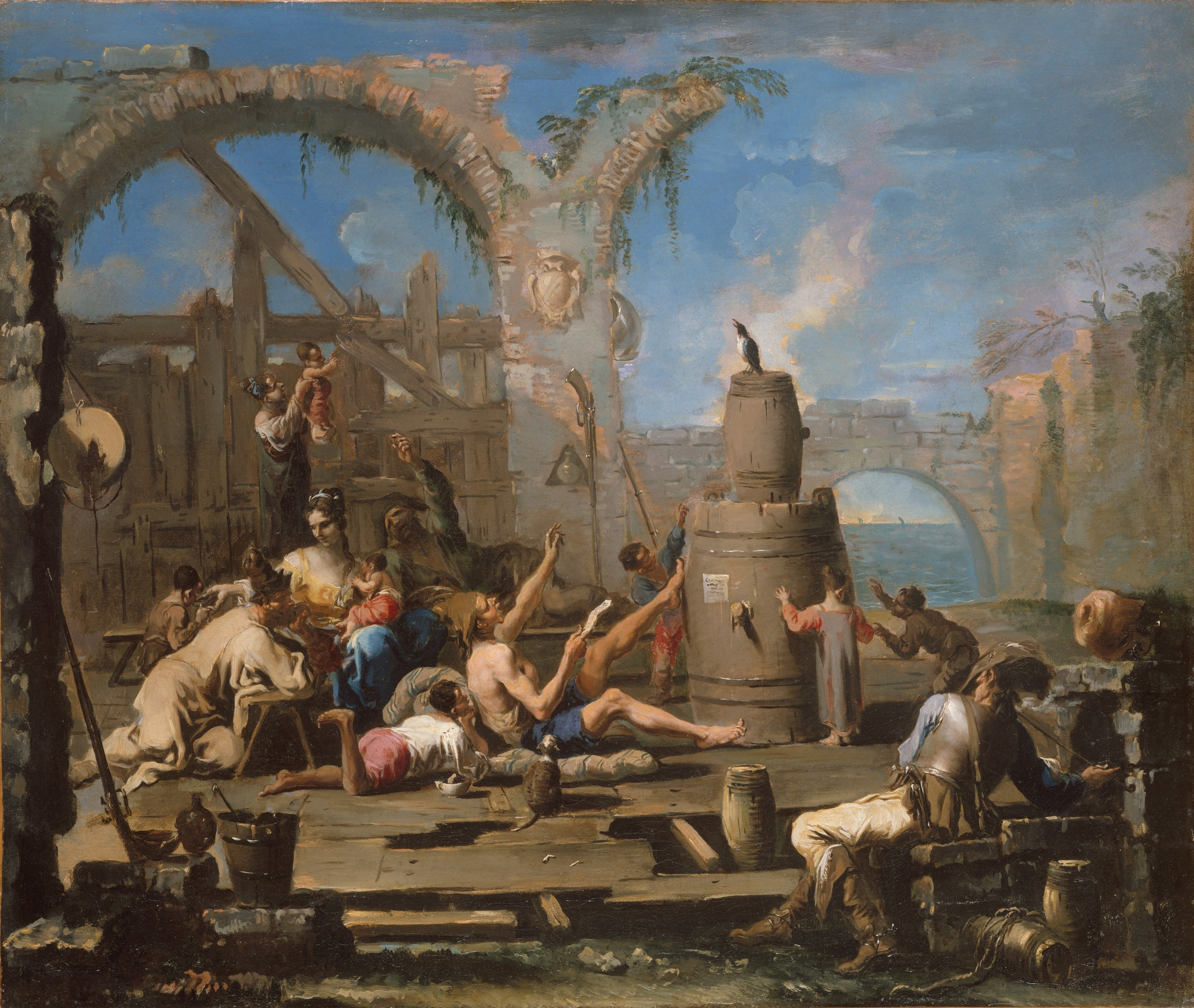
The Tame Magpie (1707–08) Metropolitan Museum of Art

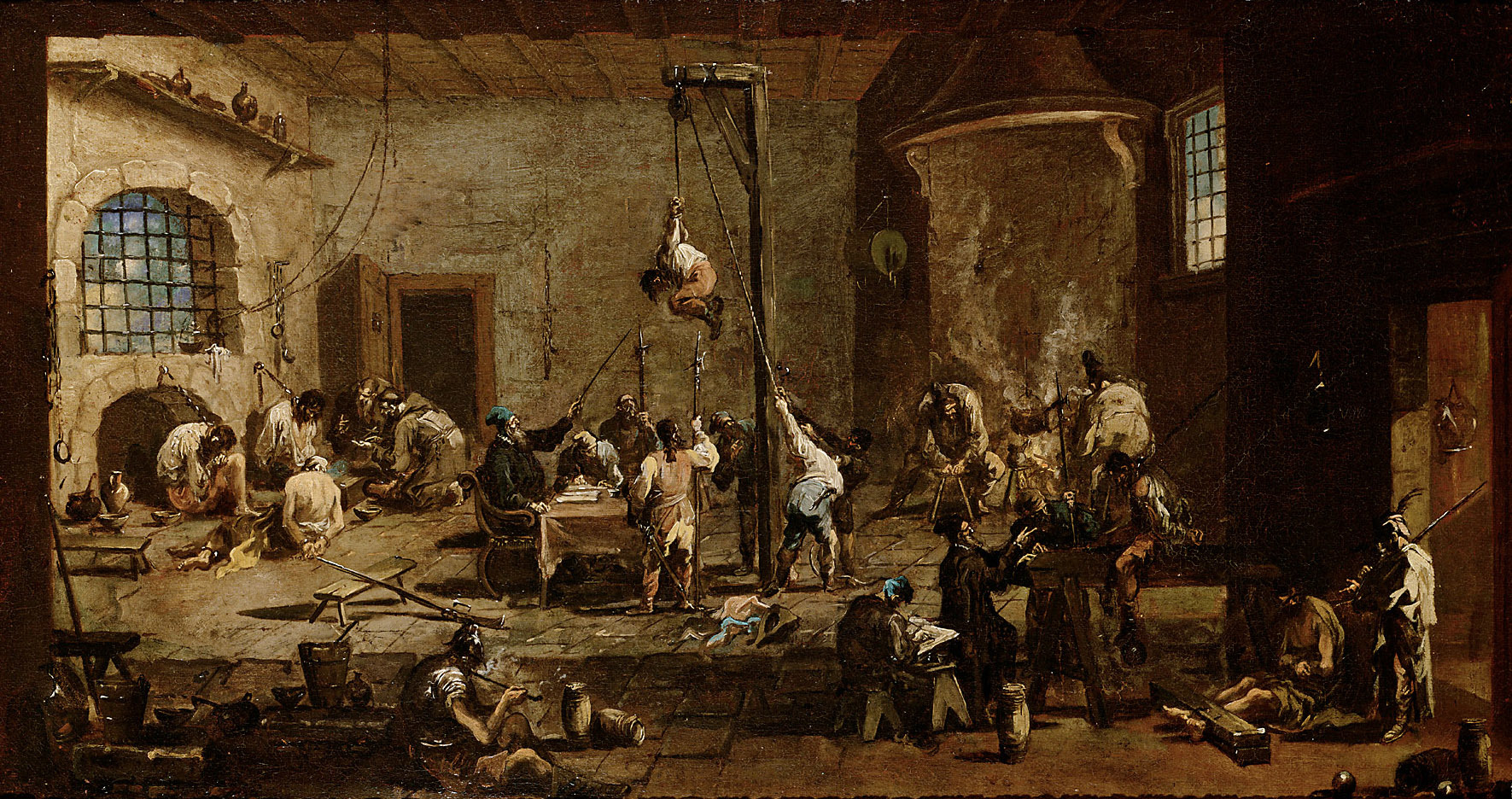
Interrogations in Jail (c. 1710) Kunsthistorisches Museum

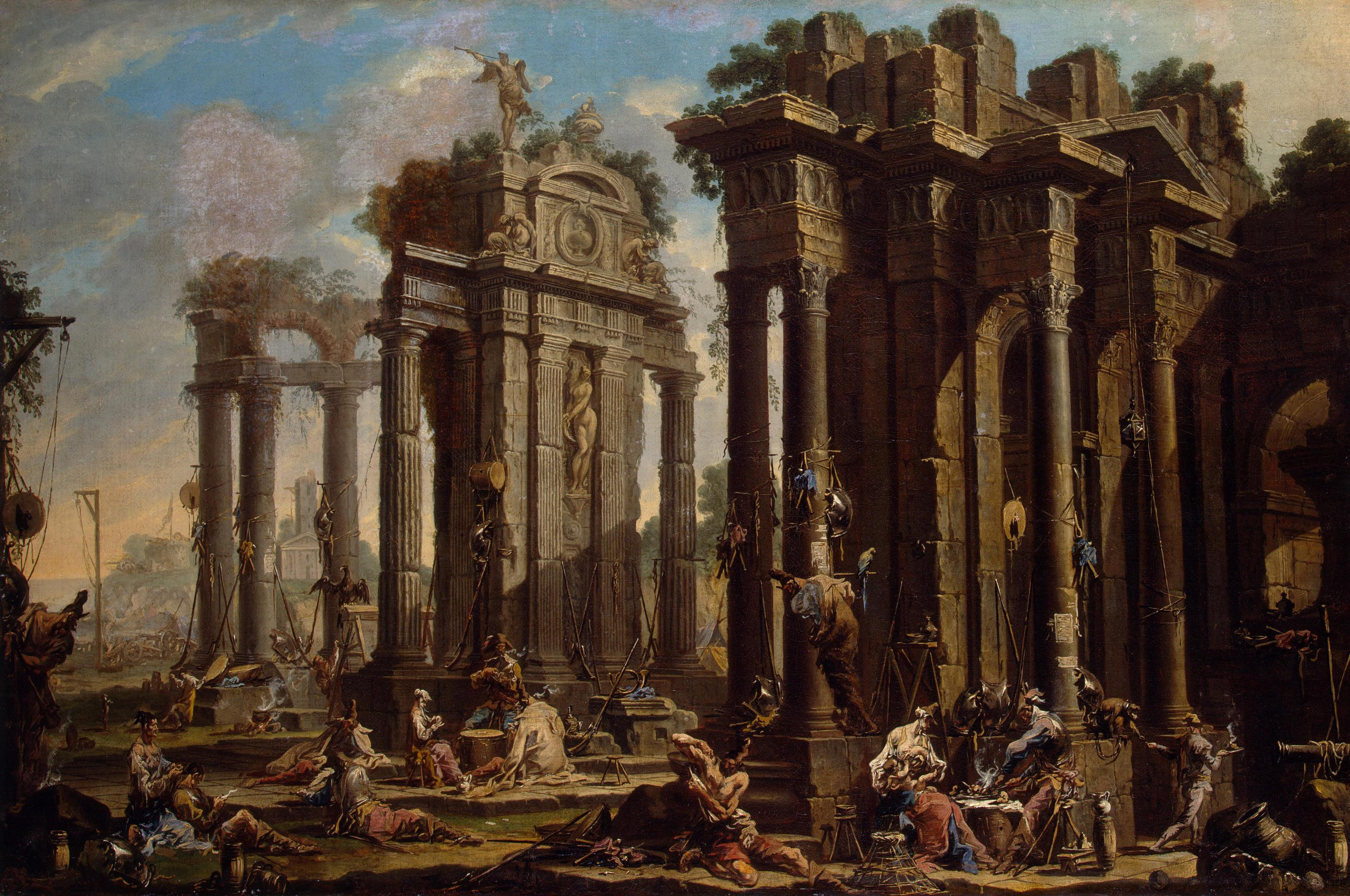
Banditti at Rest (with Clemente Spera) (c. 1710) Hermitage Museum

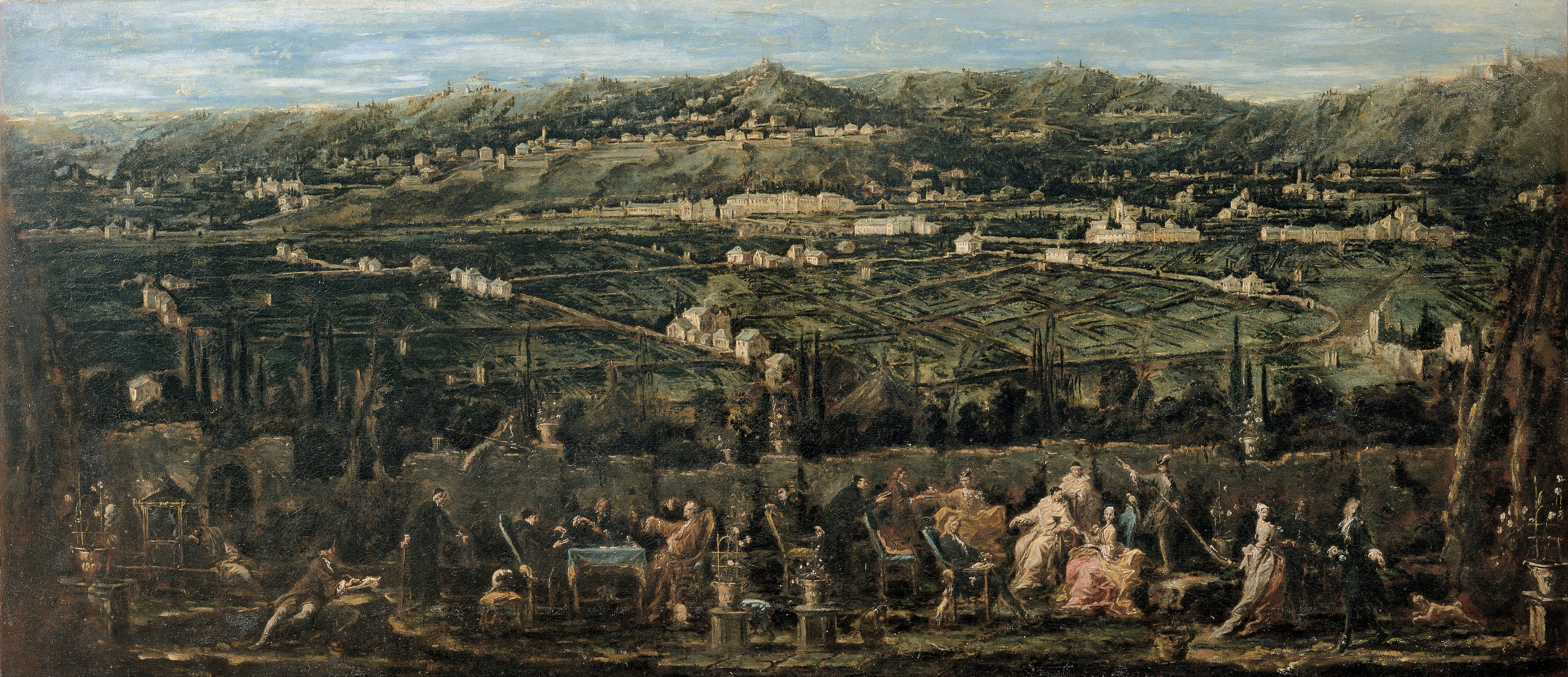
Garden Party in Albaro Strada Nuova Museums Genoa

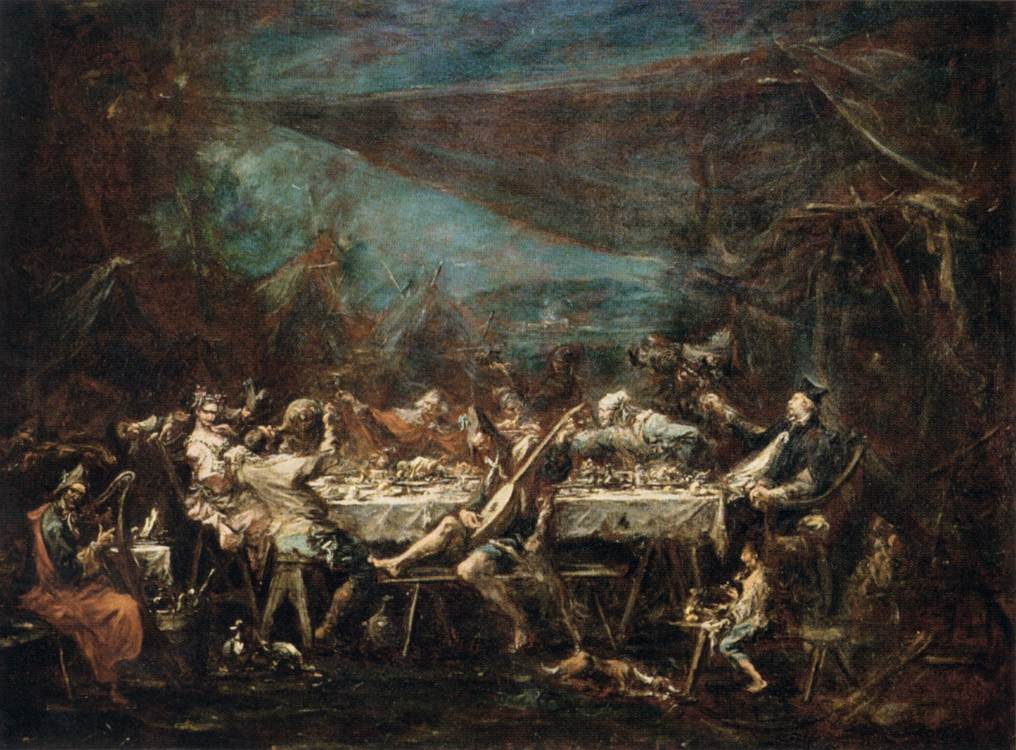
Gypsy Wedding Banquet (1730–35) Louvre

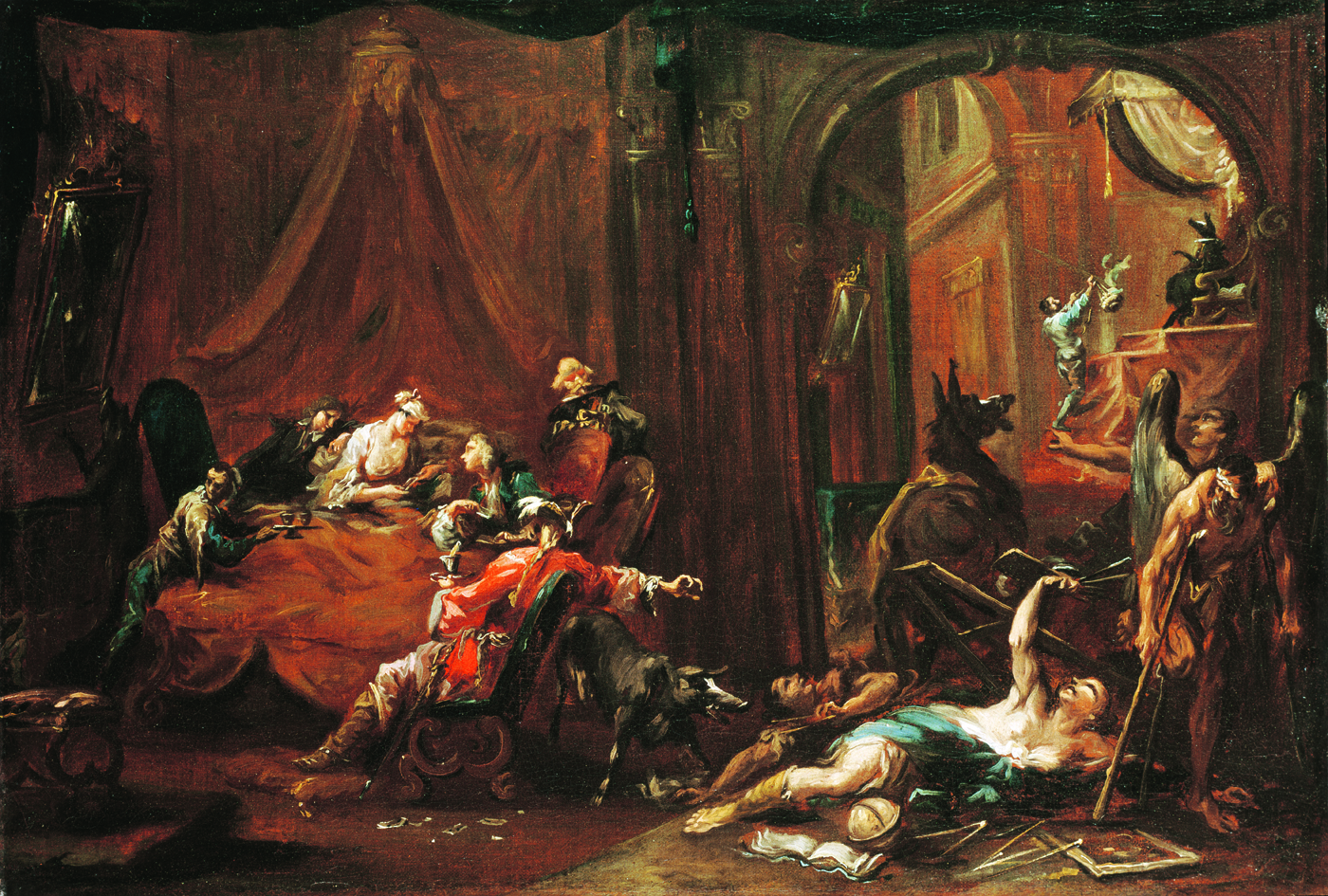
Dissipation and Ignorance destroy the Arts and Sciences (1735–1740) private collection

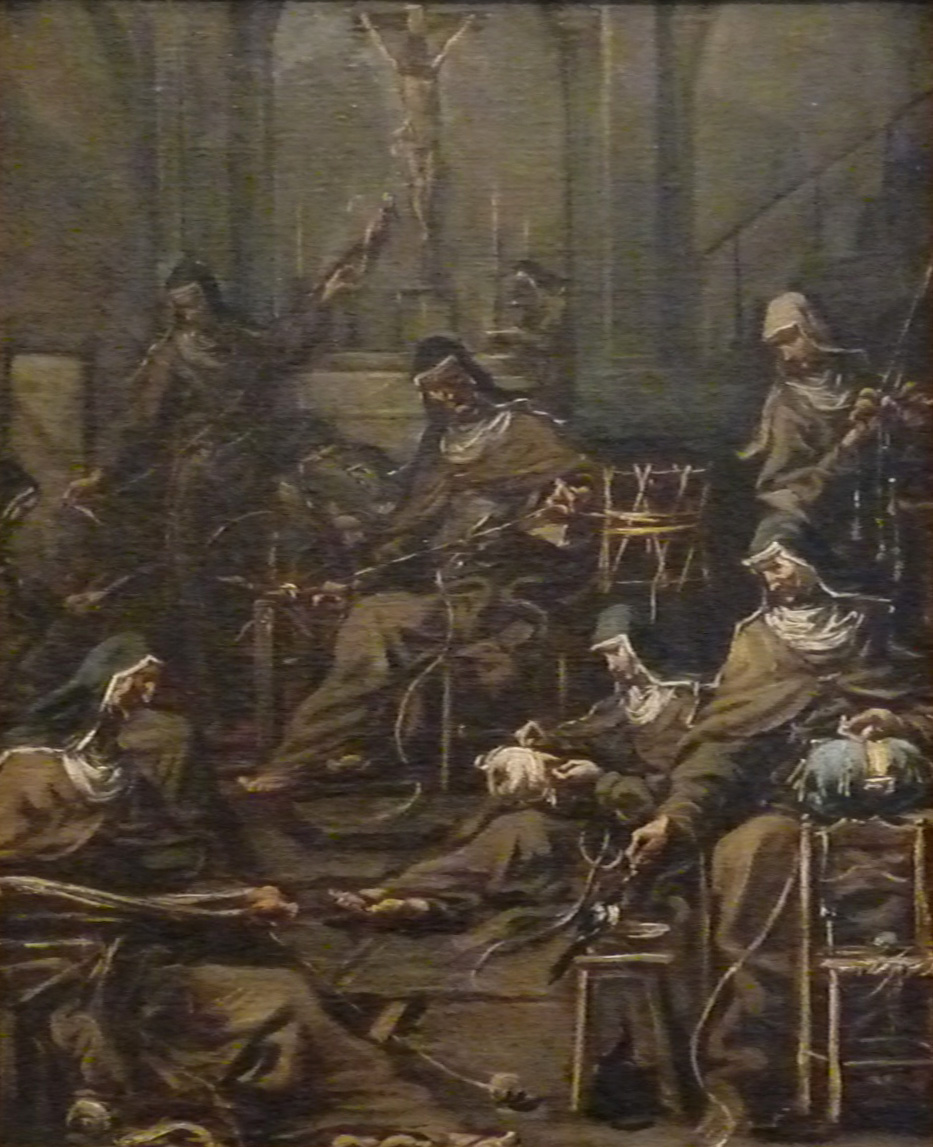
Nuns Musée des Beaux-Arts de Strasbourg

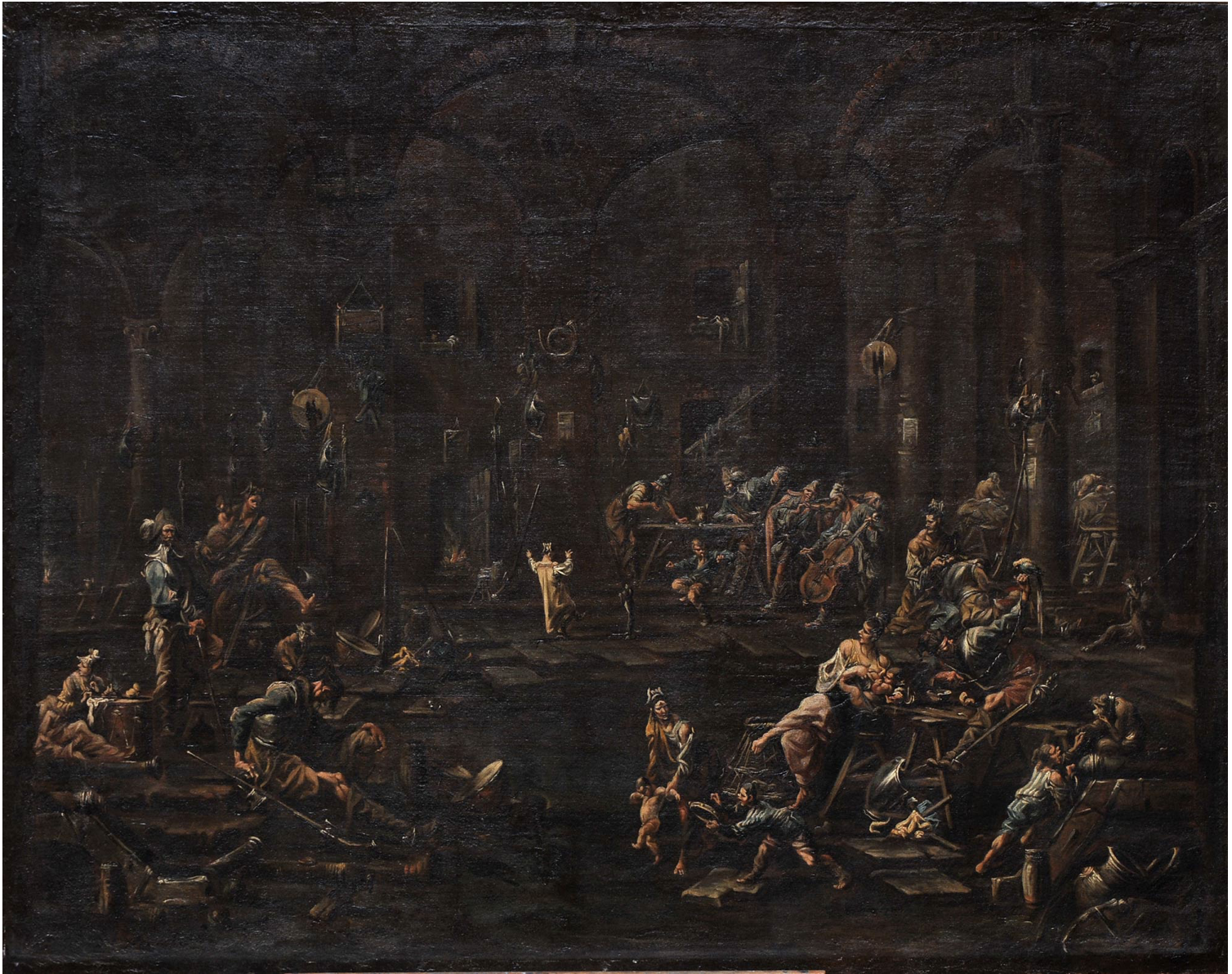
Rest of the Comedians (1730s), Odesa Museum of Western and Eastern Art

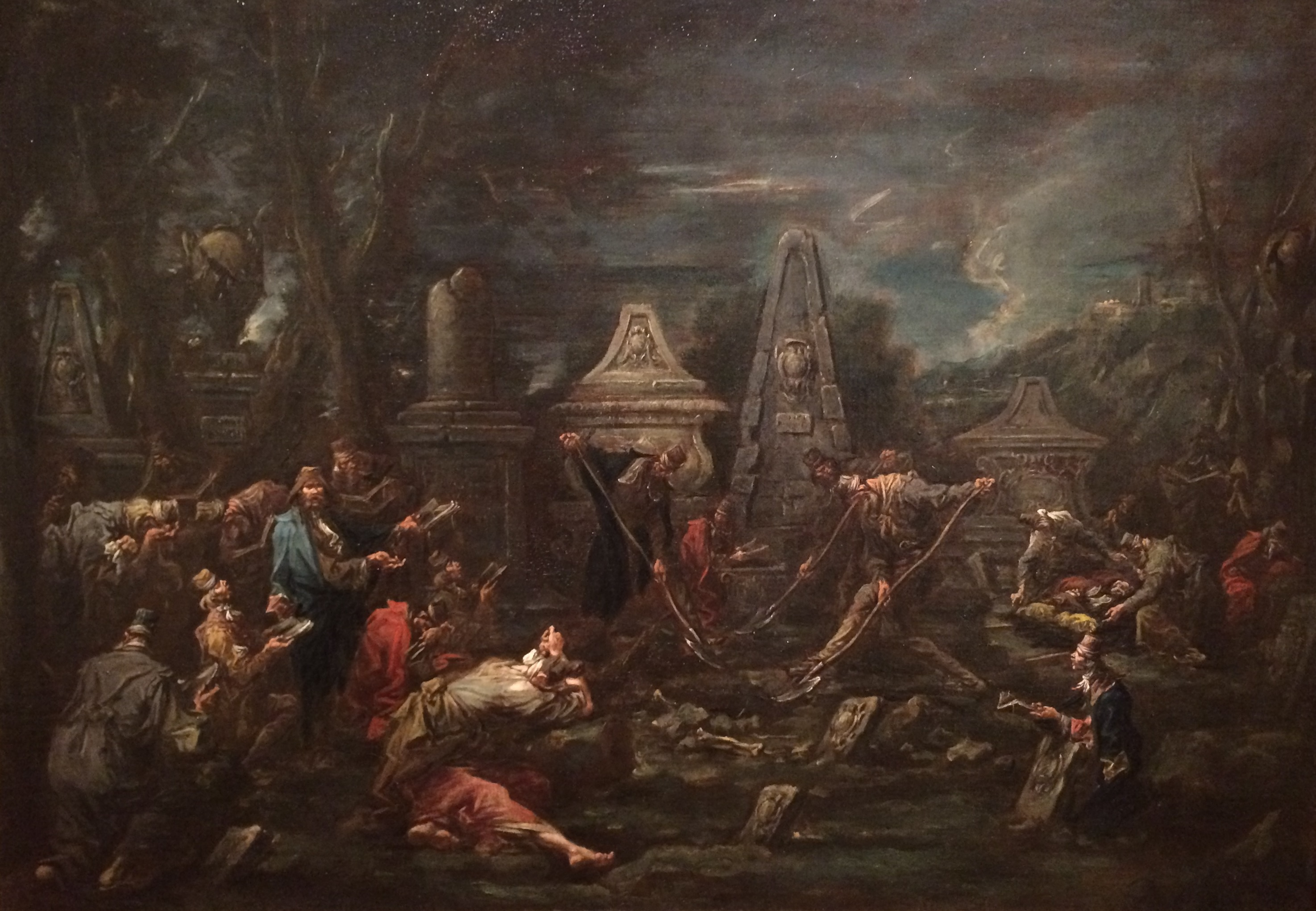
Jewish Funeral, oil on canvas, 87 x 117 cm, Musée d'Art et d'Histoire du Judaïsme

Christ at the Sea of Galilee (c. 1740) National Gallery of Art Washington DC

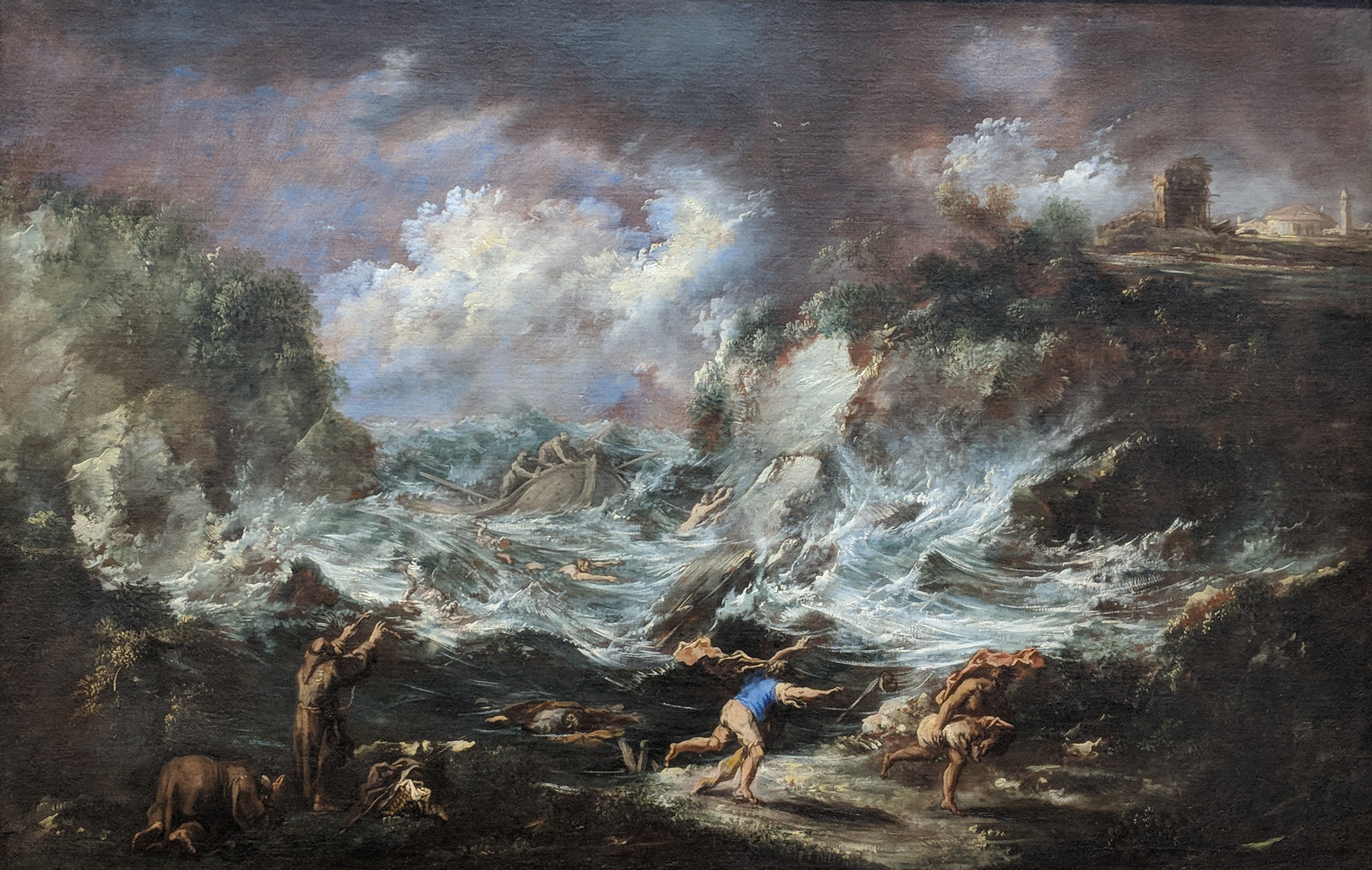
The Exorcism of the Waves (c. 1735), Memorial Art Gallery Rochester NY

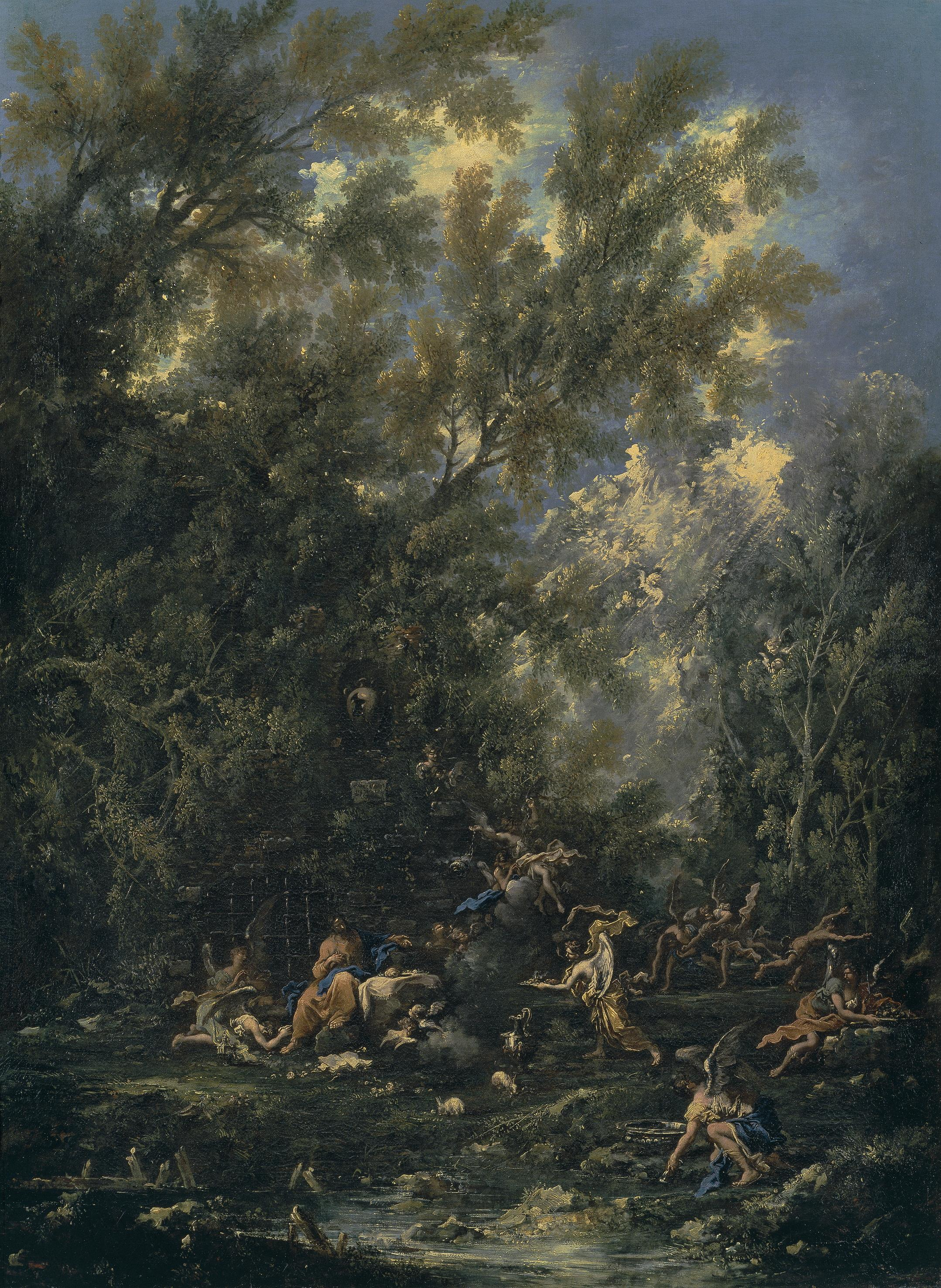
Christ attended by the Angels. C. 1705. Prado Museum. Madrid. Magnasco and Peruzzini.

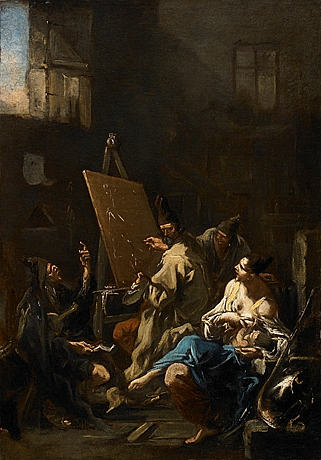
The painter's workshop. c. 1720. Real Academia de Bellas Artes de San Fernando. Madrid.

Painting	Dates	Site	Link
Gathering of Quakers	1695	Uffizi, Florence	
Theodosius Repulsed from Church by St. Ambrose	1700-10	Art Institute of Chicago	
Christ attended by angels	c. 1705	Museo del Prado, Madrid	
Christ and Samaritan Woman	1705-10	Getty Museum, Los Angeles	
Noli Me Tangere	1705-10	ibid	
The Hunting Scene	1710	Wadsworth Atheneum	
Muletrain and Castle	1710	Louvre	
Bacchanalian Scene	1710s	Hermitage Museum	
Halt of the Brigands	1710s	ibid	
Landscape with Washerwomen	1710-20	University of Michigan Museum of Art	
The Inquisition or Interrogations in a Jail	1710-20	Kunsthistorisches Museum	
The Temptation of Saint Anthony	1710-20	Louvre	
Landscape with Shepherds	c. 1710-30	São Paulo Museum of Art, São Paulo	
Pulcinella singing with Family and Lute Player	1710-35	Columbia Museum of Art, South Carolina	
Three Camaldolite Monks at Prayer	1713-14	Rijksmuseum	
Three Capuchin Friars Meditating in their Hermitage	1713-14	ibid	
Christ Adored by Two Nuns	c. 1715	Accademia	
The Sack of a City	1719-25	Brukenthal National Museum, Abbey of Seitenstetten, Sibiu	
Satire of Nobleman in Misery	1719-25	Detroit Institute of Arts	
The painter's workshop	c. 1720	Real Academia de Bellas Artes de San Fernando, Madrid	
Bacchanale	1720-30	The Getty Center in Los Angeles	
Triumph of Venus	1720-30	ibid	
Interior with Monks	1725	Norton Simon Museum	
Gamblers, Soldiers and Vagabonds	1720-30	Staatsgalerie Stuttgart	
Supper of Pulcinella & Colombina	1725-30	North Carolina Museum of Art, Raleigh	
The Synagogue	1725-30	Cleveland Museum of Art	
Consecration of a Franciscan Friar	c. 1730	El Paso Museum of Art, Texas	
Burial of a Franciscan Friar	c. 1730	El Paso Museum of Art	
Monks chapter	1730-1740	Real Academia de Bellas Artes de San Fernando, Madrid	
Sacrilegious Robbery	1731	intended for church of Siziano, now in Quadreria Arcivescovile, Milan	
Exorcism of the Waves	after 1735	Memorial Art Gallery, Rochester, New York	
Landscape with Travelers	1735-1740	New Orleans Museum of Art	
The Observant Friars in the Refectory	1736-37	Museo Civico di Bassano del Grappa	
Figures Before a Stormy Sea	ca. 1740	Honolulu Museum of Art	
The Entrance to a Hospital		Muzeul des Arta, Bucharest	
Landscape with Camaldolese friars		Museo Giannetino Luxora, Genoa	
The Marriage Banquet		Louvre	
Praying Monks		Museum voor Schone Kunsten, Ghent	
Reception in a Garden		Palazzo Bianco, Genoa	
Seashore		Hermitage Museum	
Supper at Emmaus		Convent S. Francesco in Albaro, Genoa	
The Tame Magpie		Metropolitan Museum	
Two Hermits in Forest		Louvre	
A Hermit in the Desert		Lázaro Galdiano Museum, Madrid	
Untitled			
Rest of the Comedians	1730s	Odesa Museum of Western and Eastern Art	
