= Carlo Carpioni =

Venetian painter

Carlo Carpioni was a Venetian painter. He was the son of Giulio Carpioni. He was born about the middle of the 17th century. He was educated by his father, after whose style he painted a few pictures, but he is better known by his portraits. In the Council-chamber at Vicenza and in the convent of the Servîtes at Monte Berico there are some groups of portraits of magistrates, which show an ingenious and elevated imagination.
