= Giuseppe Alabardi =

Italian painter

Giuseppe Alabardi (also called il Schioppi) was an Italian painter, active in Venice around the year 1600. Some works in the Oratory of San Nicola da Tolentino in Vicenza are attributed him. He painted architectural landscapes and quadratura and is recorded as having painted scenery for productions of operas in Venice.
