= Oratory of San Nicola da Tolentino, Vicenza =

Church building in Vicenza, Italy

Coordinates: 45°32′44″N 11°32′55″E

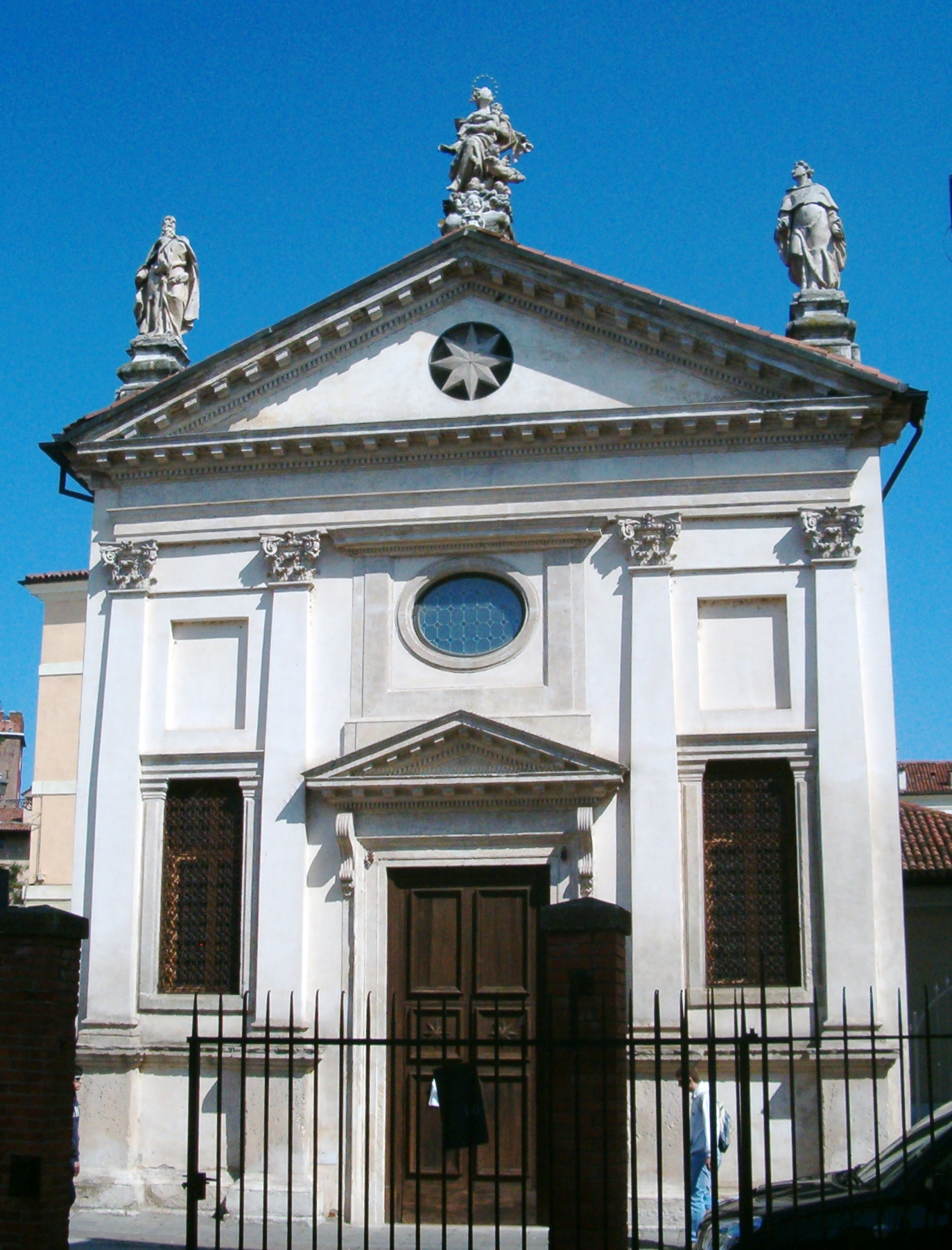
The sixteenth century Oratorio di San Nicola da Tolentino, Vicenza

The Oratory of San Nicola da Tolentino (in Italian, Oratorio di San Nicola da Tolentino) is a small chapel-like structure located in Vicenza, Veneto, Italy. It is renowned for its superb collection of 16th and 17th-century paintings.

== History ==
The initial construction of the Oratory of San Nicola da Tolentino took place between 1505 and 1681, with Carlo Bottiron completing the project. Subsequently, the building has undergone several renovations. From 1634 to 1654, the structure was lengthened and raised, and the side windows were modified to allow better illumination of the paintings. The construction of the facade was finalized in 1678, allowing the public to view the oratory, characterized by four pilasters in Corinthian order.

By the end of the 18th century, the facade of the oratory underwent a complete redesign by priest Giuseppe Medici. The oratory remained in good condition until World War II. It was subsequently restored in 1946, and further renovations took place in the 2000s.

=== Art ===
The committee managing the construction of the Oratory commissioned the art over time, all about the life of San Nicola. For example, the glorious Altarpiece depicting The Holy Trinity was sculpted by Francesco Maffei.

== Features ==
Construction of a home for the venerable confraternity of the saint began in 1505 and was completed by 1681, when the facade was finished (attributed to Carlo Bottiron). It is dedicated to Saint Nicholas of Tolentino.

The interior has a number of canvases based upon events and miracles in the life of San Nicola, many inserted in niches in the wall; works include:

- Ceiling cycles (1677–78) by Giulio Carpioni.
- On the right
  - 1st inset wall by Antonio Zanchi.
  - 2nd inset canvases by Francesco Maffei.
  - 3rd inset canvases (1656) by Giovanni Carpioni.
- On the right
  - 1st inset wall (1662) by Giovanni Cozza.
  - 2nd inset canvases by Maffei.
  - 3rd inset canvases by Maffei.

Three statues inside were completed in 1679 by Francesco Pozzo, including a "Madonna and child", "Saint Augustine and Nicola". Giuseppe Alabardi also has a work here. The soft stone statues in the stands depict John the Evangelist, The Assumption, Jesus and John the Baptist. The centre of the ceiling shows "Dead Saint Nicholas ascends to heaven". The various paintings that depict Nicolas' miracles on the inner wall of the facade include Saint Nicholas and the angel save a child from the devil, Saint Nicholas makes water flow from a cane planted in the ground, and on the lower band, Saint Nicholas heals an amputated arm of an Augustinian friar.

A cycle of eleven canvases line the ceiling, surrounded by baroque stuccos by Rinaldo Viseto. The central band features paintings on the themes of Meditation (a man looks up, while two women observe a skull on the ground) and Charity (a woman holds a cross and chalice). On the right side of the ceiling we find: Chastity (a woman crushing what appears to be Cupid); The Sobriety (a man, bandaged at the mouth with a scroll on which is written Pauca vescor ("Just enough for me") and Obedience (a woman with a crucifix kneels under a yoke). On the left side of the ceiling there are: Patience (a woman with a cross and Gospel holding a flame), The Penance (the devil flies over a woman) and the gentleness (a humble woman carries a lamb).

== Sources ==
- Vicenza commune
- YouTube video recounts restoration.
