= Clemente Spera =

Italian Baroque painter

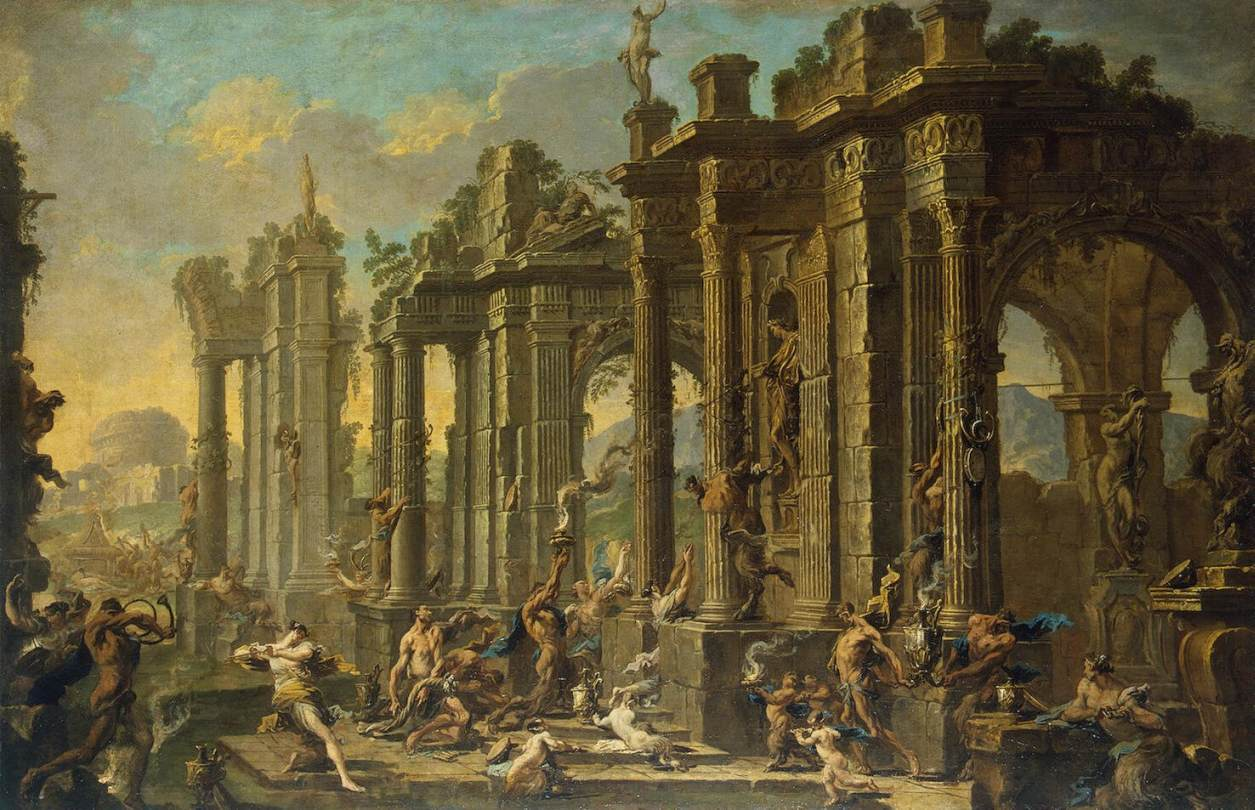
Bacchanalian scene, with Alessandro Magnasco

Clemente Spera (Novara (?), c. 1661 – Milan, 1742) was an Italian painter of the Baroque period principally active in Milan. He was a specialist architectural painter who created capricci, i.e. architectural fantasies, placing together buildings, archaeological ruins and other architectural elements in fictional and often fantastical combinations together with figures. He was a frequent collaborator with the prominent painter Alessandro Magnasco and painted for him the scenic background architectural elements and ruins.

== Life ==
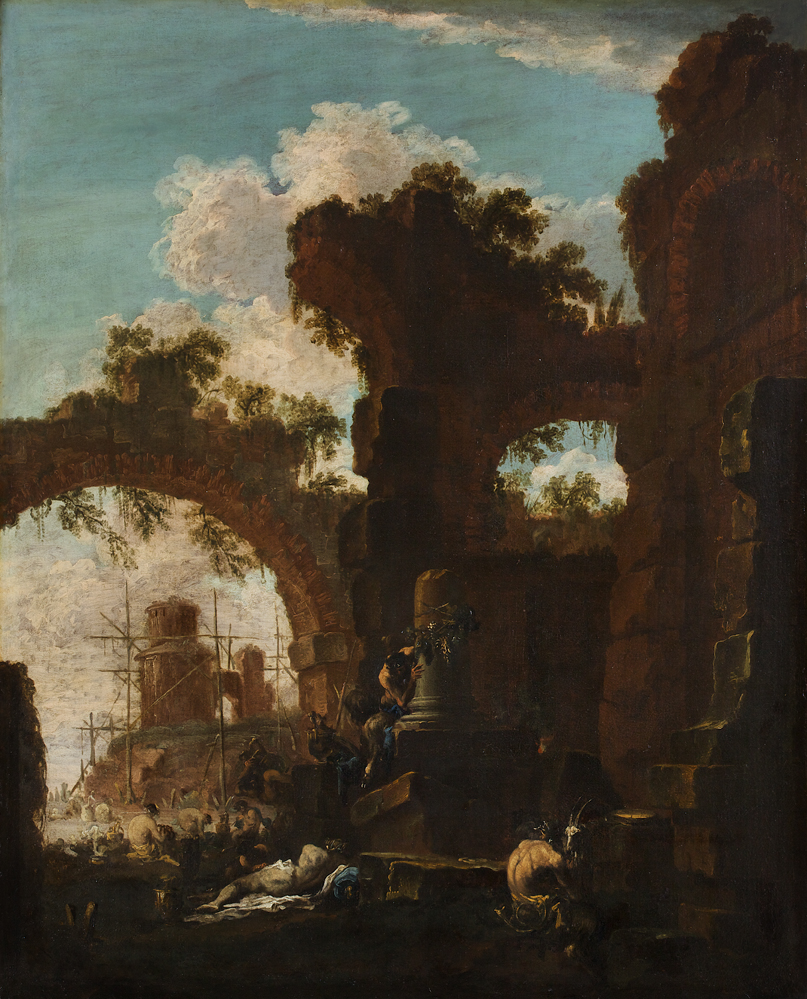
Feast of Satyrs with Alessandro Magnasco

Very little is known for certain about Clemente Spera's life. He is believed to have been born in Novara, in Piedmont. He was trained in Milan in the workshop of Giovanni Ghisolfi. He was active in Milan throughout his career.

== Work ==
Spera made a name as a painter of architecture, in particular of classical ruins and capricci. He was sought after by eminent figure painters to paint in the architectural elements of their compositions.

Spera's collaborations with Magnasco are the best-known. Spera painted the architectural elements, often ruins of sumptuous classical buildings that supported the often wild scenes depicted by Magnasco. A typical example of such a collaboration is the Feast of Satyrs (between 1710 and 1715, Museum Kunstpalast). In this picture the artists seems to have intended to accentuate the caricatural aspects of the behavior of the feasting satyrs. Architecture, landscape and sky are used to express the internal state of the various figures. Bizarre, crumbling remnants of sublime architecture provide the backdrop for the funny goings-on of the satyrs. In rhythmic repetition three successively staggered, large arches with feathery vegetation divide the space of the composition. The center of the space is occupied by a vine-covered, broken column shaft. The figures seem almost reduced to casual narration and yet their turbulence and drunkenness are reflected in the moving, bizarre ruins. The viewer is kept at a distance from the carousing satyrs. One sleeping drunkard on the left and another with a goat on the right only show their bare backsides. A third satyr who clings to the large column shaft appears to have no good intentions. Only at second glance it becomes clear that the apparent disorder is organized by a strict ordering principle, since all three satyrs embrace the center in the form of an equilateral triangle.

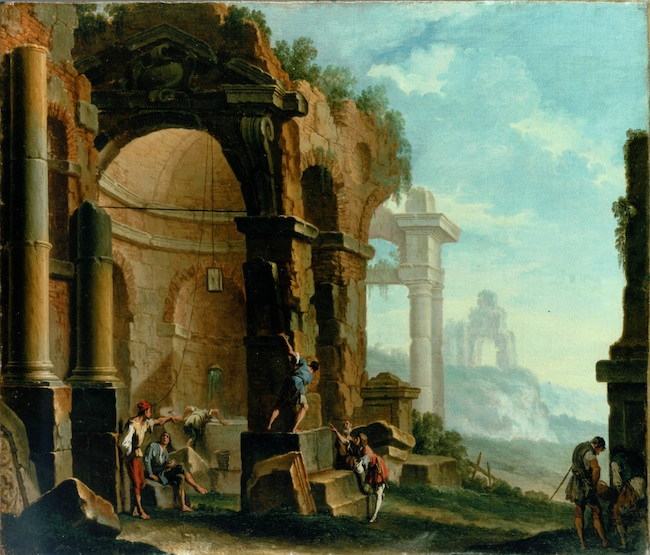
Antique ruins with figures with Sebastiano Ricci

Spera also collaborated with other leading figure painters. A collaboration with Venetian painter Sebastiano Ricci is known from their composition Antique ruins with figures (At Galerie Maurizio Nobile in Paris). This collaboration probably needs to be situated during Ricci's visit to Milan in 1694–1695. The ruins painted by Spera in this composition do not attempt to depict any known classical ruins. The figures by Ricci show an elongated morphology, which anticipates a later development in Ricci's style. In the centre of the composition a young man dressed as a nobleman indicates something to a peasant who is about to climb the ruins. On the left some men are engaged in conversation in front of a person bowing over a well.
