= Giulio Carpioni =

Venetian painter (1613–1678)

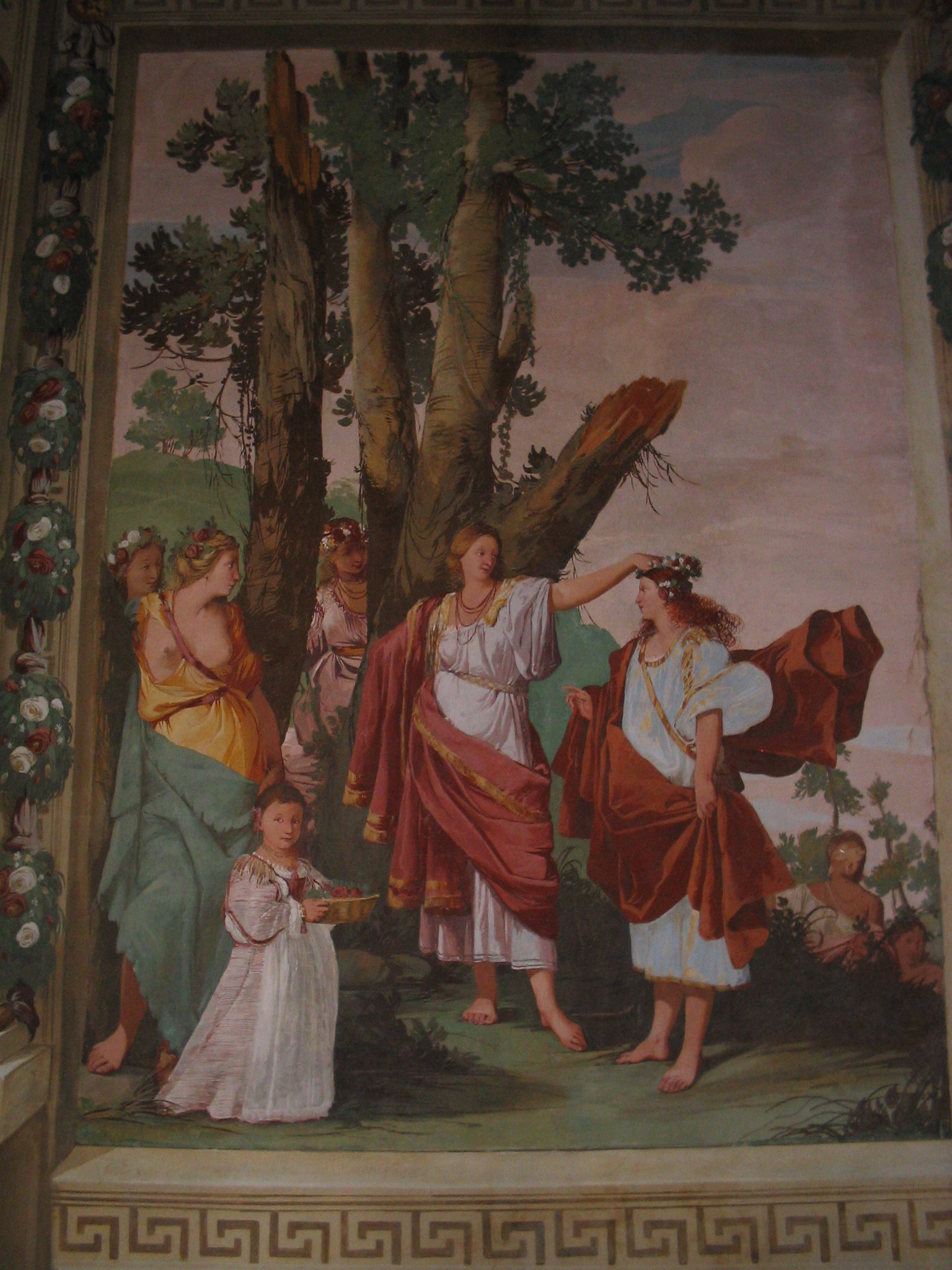
Fresco in Villa Caldogno Nordera, Caldogno, Vicenza, Italy

Giulio Carpioni (1613 – 29 January 1678) was a Venetian painter and etcher of the early Baroque era.

== Life ==
Born probably in Venice, Carpioni studied under Alessandro Varotari (il Padovanino) and was also influenced by the work of Simone Cantarini, Carlo Saraceni and Jean Leclerc. He came into contact with Lombard art after a brief visit to Bergamo in 1631. In 1638, he settled in Vicenza and executed most of his work there.

== Work ==
He painted history and bacchanals, and also sacred subjects of a small size, many of which are to be seen in the churches in the Venetian states. Paintings by him may be seen in the Galleries of Augsburg, Dresden, Vienna, Modena, and Florence. He was also an etcher; his best plates being St. Anthony of Padua, Christ on the Mount of Olives, The Virgin reading, and The Virgin with Rosary. He died at Verona. Carlo Carpioni, his son, was also a painter.

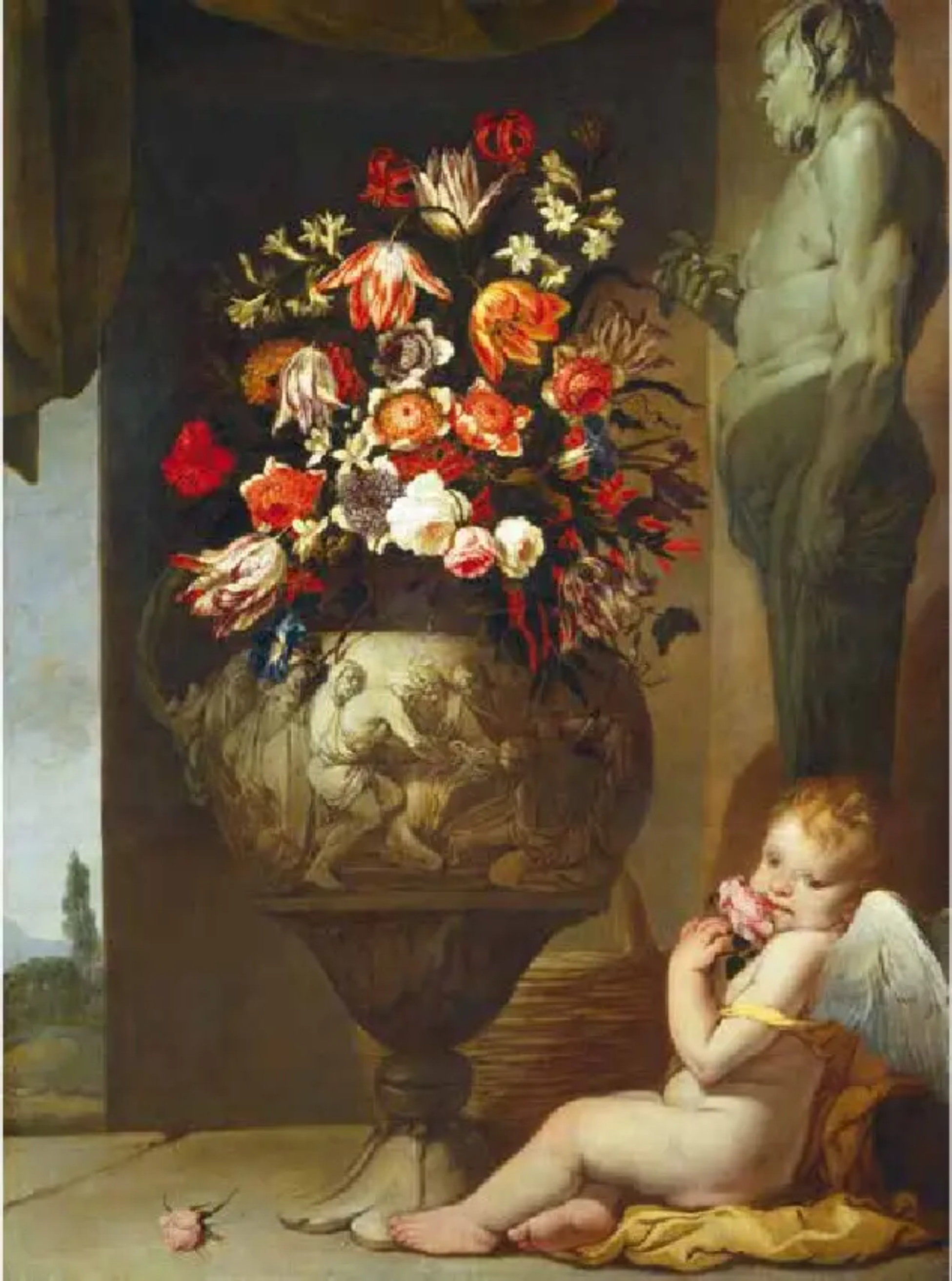
Smell, collaboration with Francesco Caldei

Among his important works are the Apotheosis of the Dolfin family (1647) and the Allegory of the Grimani Family (1651), and altarpiece of Sant'Antonio da Padova, a Virgin and two saints, and a Triumph of Silenus in the Gallerie dell'Accademia of Venice. He painted a series of canvases for the Oratory of San Nicola da Tolentino in Vicenza.

It is believed that he collaborated with other painters such as Francesco Caldei who added still life elements or animals in his compositions. An example is the pair of allegories of Touch and Smell (private collection) in which Caldei painted the flowers in an urn and Carpioni painted the rest.

== Selected works ==
- Crucifixion (1648, Gallerie dell'Accademia, Venice).
- Apollo and Marsyas (Private Collection).
- Neptune Pursuing Coronis (Uffizi Gallery, Florence)
- Liriope bringing Narcissus before Tiresias (Private Collection)
- Banquet of the Gods (attributed, Querini-Stampalia Gallery, Venice

== Sources ==
- Bryan, Michael (1886). Robert Edmund Graves (ed.). Dictionary of Painters and Engravers, Biographical and Critical. Vol. I: A-K. London: George Bell and Sons. p. 237.
- Calabi, A. "The Etchings of Giulio Carpioni." The Print Collector’s Quarterly (1924) Vol. 11 : 133–161. Entries: 14.
