= Pietro Lauro =

Italian translator and scholar (1510–1568)

Pietro Lauro, also known as Pietro Lauro Modonese or Pietro Lauro da Modona
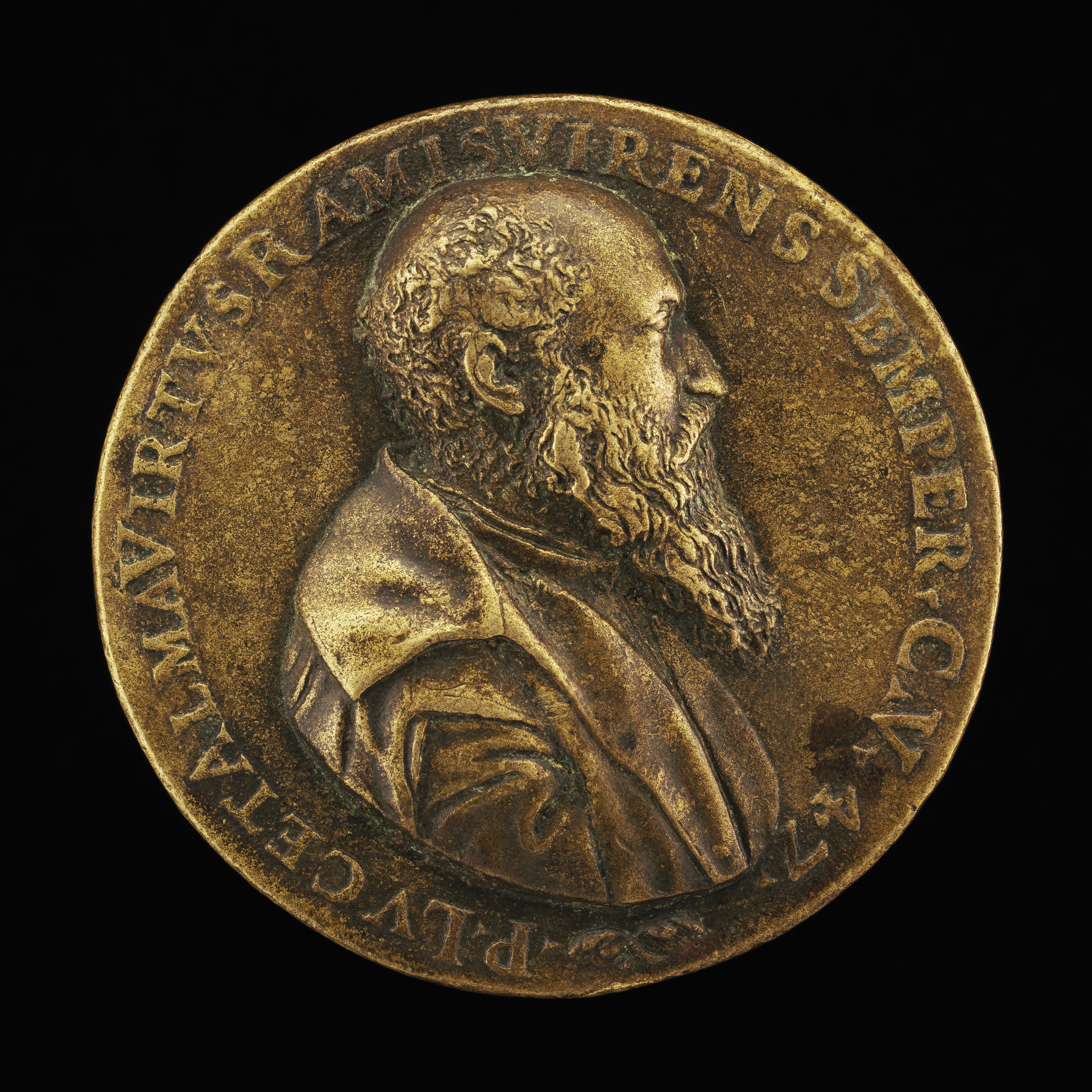
- Bronze medal from 1555 created by Alessandro Vittoria, depicting Lauro's profile, preserved at the National Gallery of Art in Washington, D.C.
- Born: c. 1510; Modena
- Died: c. 1568; Venice
- Occupations: Translator, Writer, Science communicator
- Era: 1500s

Pietro Lauro (1510–1568) was one of the most well-known Italian polymaths of the 16th century. His work includes translations from Latin, Ancient Greek, and Spanish, covering texts by classical, foreign, and Protestant authors. Lauro demonstrated skill in handling texts on diverse topics, such as philosophy, architecture, medicine, gardening, agronomy, biological sciences, history, theology, and astronomy. He also ventured into writing a chivalric romance in the style of Spanish works, the Polendo, his magnum opus in this regard.

An adherent of the Protestant Reformation, although his translations were criticized by his contemporaries for being overly literal, crude, and impartial, Lauro is credited with completing the translation into the vernacular of numerous classical, scientific, and epistolary texts. His works achieved significant circulation, not only among the Venetian literati of his time but throughout Italy, to the extent that some of his translations are still reprinted in new editions today.

== Biography ==
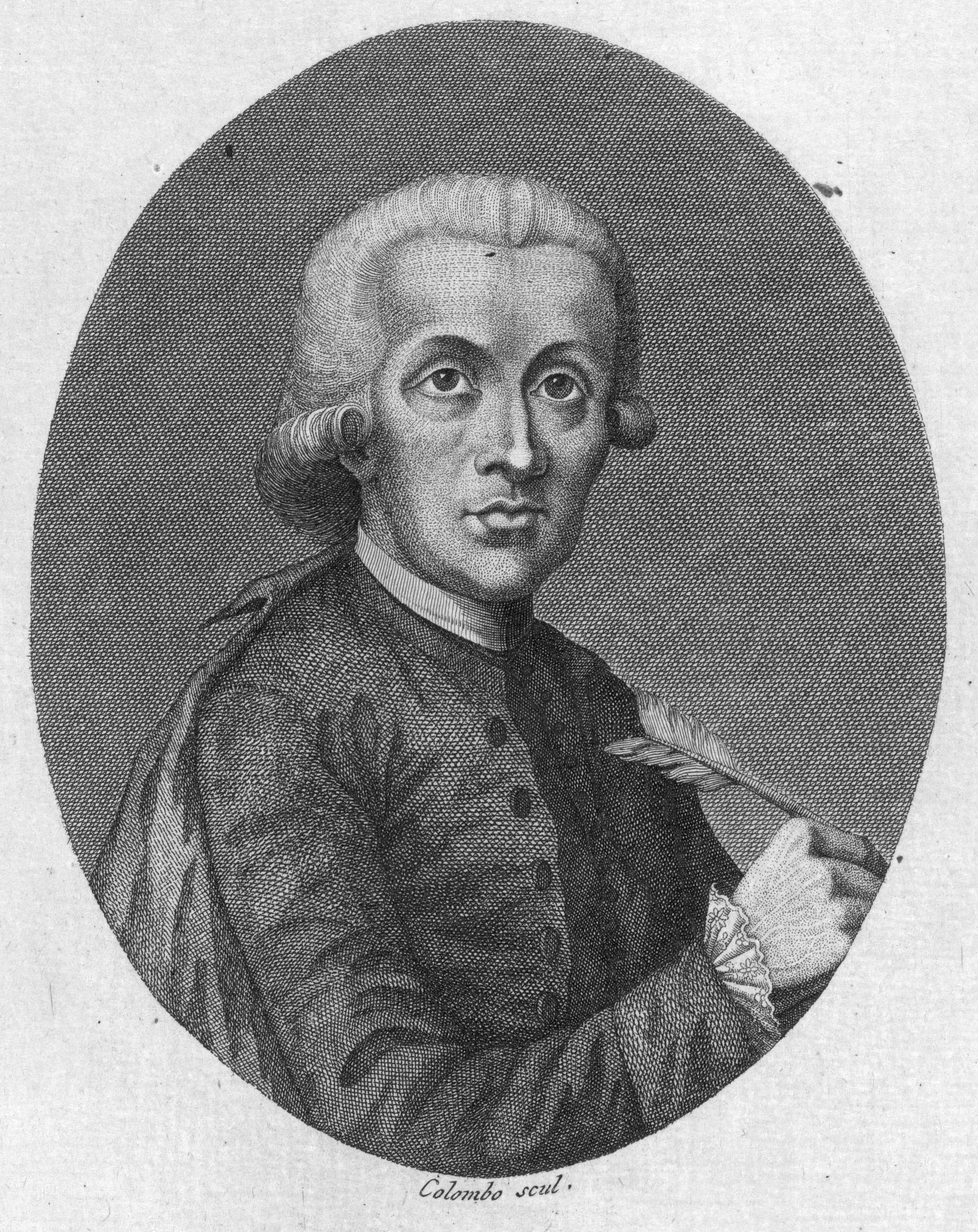
Girolamo Tiraboschi was the first to attempt to reconstruct Lauro’s biography

=== Youth ===
Little is known about Lauro’s life, and few biographical details are certain. It is presumed that he was born around 1510, possibly from a family of humble origins. The only reference to his youth is a testimony by Lodovico Castelvetro, his contemporary and fellow Modenese, later recorded in writing by Girolamo Tiraboschi:

I do not know for certain who this man is or could be, who calls himself Pietro Lauro da Modona; but I can reasonably imagine that he is from the countryside of Modena, and that he was a friar who, upon abandoning the habit, changed his name and family name, since in Modena or its countryside, the name is not Lauro but Meloro.

This testimony, however, is contradicted by other sources; Tiraboschi himself doubts some of its suggestions, such as the possibility that Lauro became a friar. He likely received a fragmented and not particularly advanced education; it is believed he may have pursued university studies at Bologna or Padua, although his name does not appear in the Acta graduum of either institution. Considering his scientific dissemination work in the medical field, it is thought he may have attended university courses in medicine, but this is not supported by reliable sources. It is almost certain, however, that like many future scholars born in the 1510s of the 16th century, such as Lodovico Dolce, Anton Francesco Doni, Girolamo Ruscelli, and Niccolò Franco, Lauro came into contact with the works of Erasmus of Rotterdam, including Adagia, De conscribendis epistolis, and De duplici copia verborum ac rerum.

=== First Venetian period (1539–1546) ===
==== Employment ====
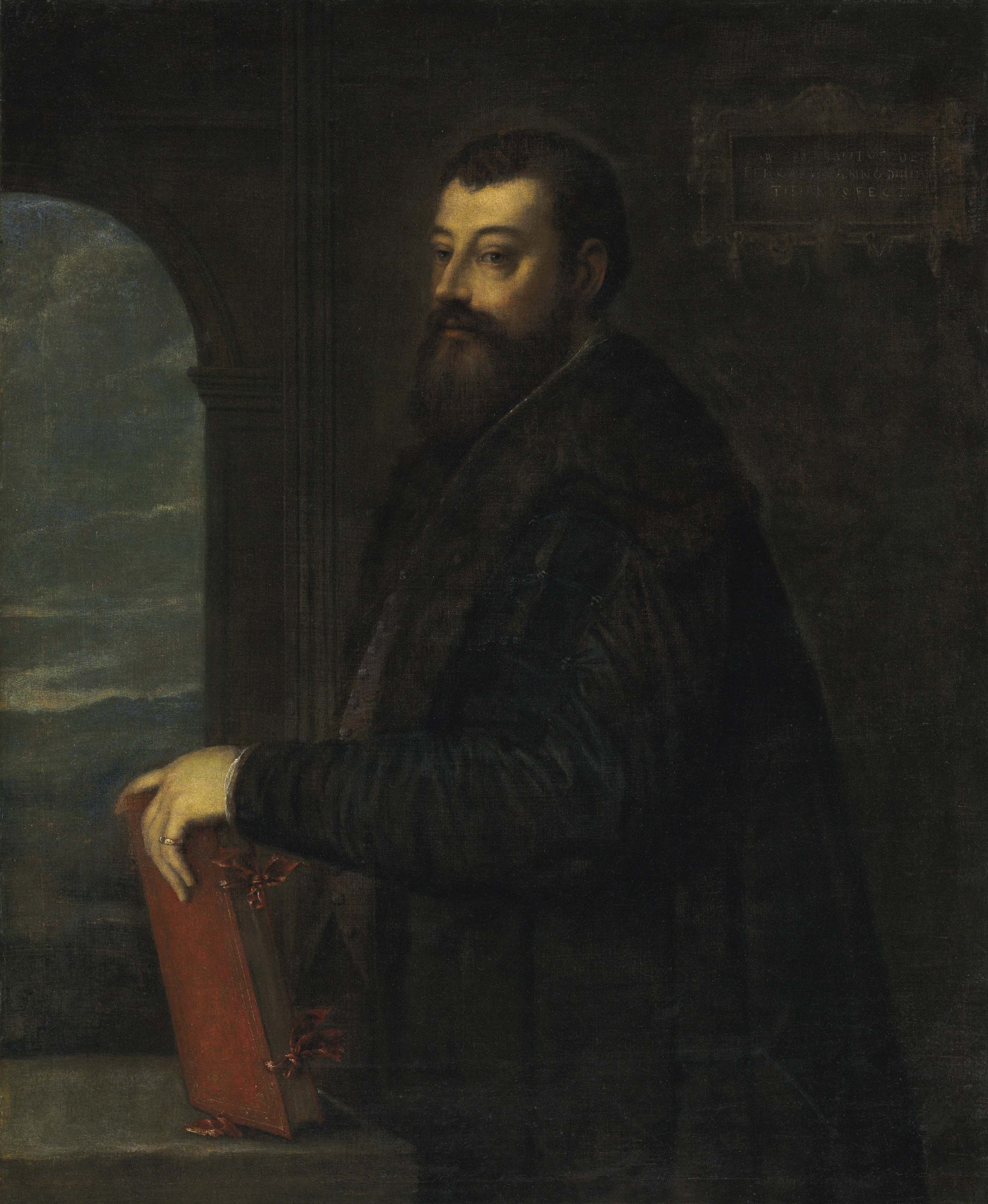
Gabriele Giolito de' Ferrari, the printer for whom Lauro translated numerous classical texts

Like other Italian scholars, Lauro was drawn to the job opportunities offered by the Venetian printing industry, settling in the lagoon city perhaps in the early 1540s. However, his first work, printed in the same city, is dated 1539: the Petri Lauri Mutinensis Preludium ad copiam dicendi, ubi et obiter muliebre ingenium mobile et uarium, porut [sic] copia dicendi potuit, exprimitur, of which a single copy survives today, included in a miscellaneous volume, preserved at the Vatican Library. In style and structure, it is an educational text, possibly compiled during teaching activities; this may explain Castelvetro’s statement:

This man thus sustained his life miserably, by running a private school and teaching the first letters to children in Venice, [...]

But here too, Tiraboschi says:

[...] he sought to contribute to good studies, and therefore should not be abandoned among the ignoble crowd of crude pedants.

Lauro was likely not merely a grammarian limited to teaching the basics of Latin to children or youths but a true professor (also of Ancient Greek) who taught students engaged in more advanced studies. Alongside this teaching activity, he undertook other remunerative tasks to support his large family (known from his letters), such as writing on commission or working as a copyist (a handwritten copy by him of the Comentari delle cose turchesche is held at the Civic Museum Correr). In Venice, Lauro is also recorded as a schoolteacher in documents from 1561, an employment further evidenced by a letter addressed to him by Lucrezia Gonzaga di Gazzuolo in 1552. Beyond this information, it is nearly impossible to reconstruct Lauro’s biography before 1542 with certainty. From his letters, it is known that he lived in near poverty throughout his life, despite the help and financial support from acquaintances and friends, often foreign, in addition to the income generated by his works.

It was his activity as a vernacular translator of classical texts that made him most famous: between 1542 and 1568, there were prolific entrepreneurial initiatives to print Latin or Greek texts in the Italian vernacular. Primarily, this activity was undertaken by Venetian printers such as Gabriele Giolito de' Ferrari, who, in 1542, four years after inheriting his father’s business, surrounded himself with numerous scholars employed in assembling, editing, and vernacularizing classical and European texts. The category of polygraphs, of which Lauro became a part, consisting of writers and translators who dealt with varied and sometimes significantly different topics for dissemination purposes, experienced its most intense phase during this period.

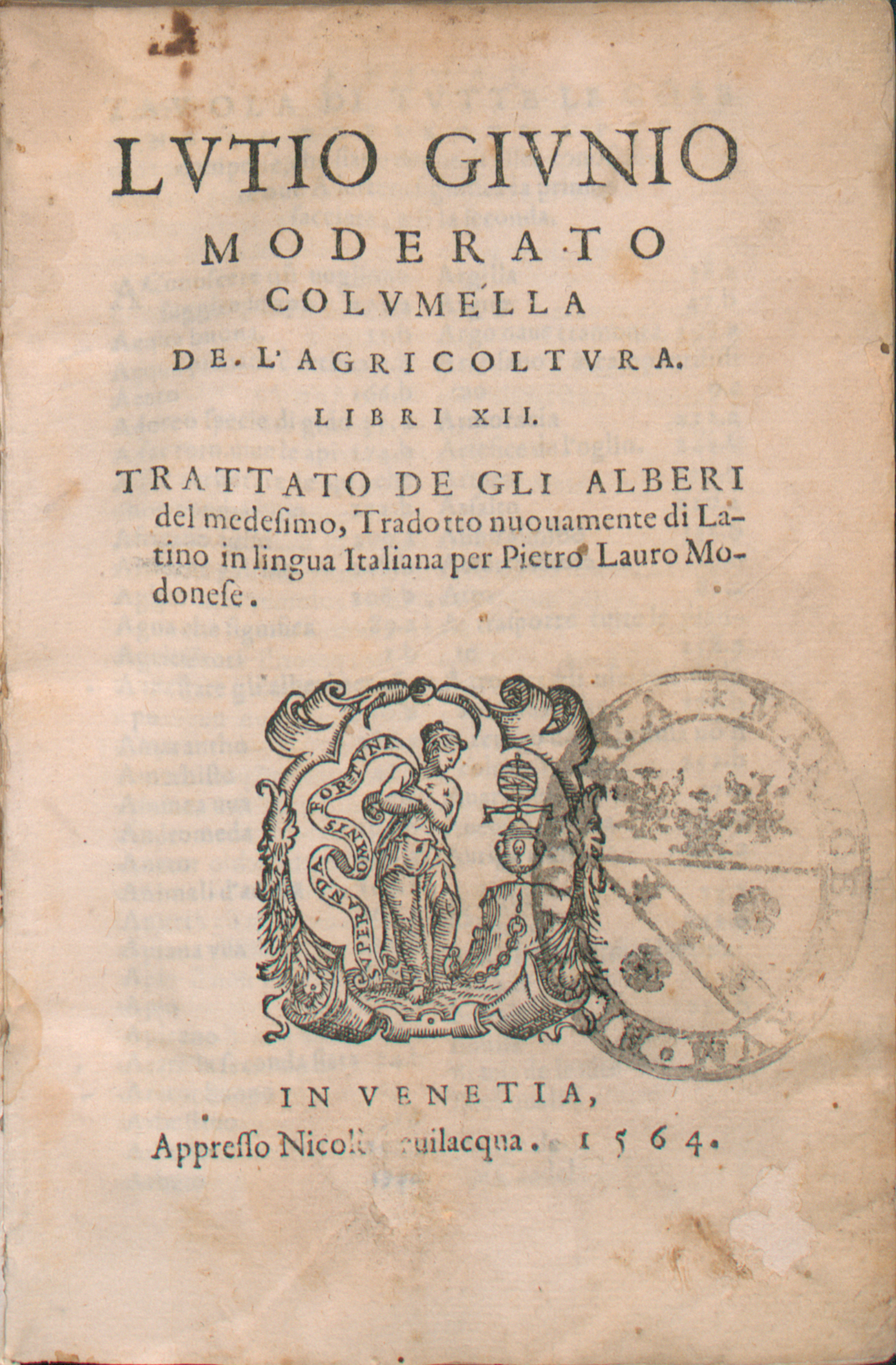
Title page of the twelfth book of the De l'agricoltura by Lucio Giunio Moderato Columella, translated by Lauro in 1564

==== First translations ====
Although the publishing program of printing houses was subject to the approval of their owners, they allowed considerable freedom for the proposals and advice of their collaborators. Lauro thus began his career as a translator in 1542, proposing and completing the first vernacular translation of the Oneirocritica by Artemidorus of Daldis for Giolito, titled Dell'interpretatione de sogni, dedicated to Diego Hurtado de Mendoza y Pacheco, the Spanish ambassador in Venice. Even today, some Italian editions of this text use this version, based on the 1547 reprint. This was soon followed by the De' notevoli et utilissimi ammaestramenti dell'agricoltura, a translation of the Geoponica, a Byzantine work then attributed to the emperor Constantine VII Porphyrogenitus, now to Cassianus Bassus, an author who lived between the 6th and 7th centuries. After these initial works, which, as confirmed by examinations of the prefaces, were the result of his personal initiative in selecting texts, Lauro caught the attention of other printers, such as Michele Tramezzino, with whom he began collaborating concurrently. Tramezzino entrusted him with the translation of the Chronica by the German astronomer Johann Carion. These historical-annalistic texts were highly successful at the time, and Lauro, again for Tramezzino, translated another the following year, the Catalogo de gli anni et Principi de la creatione de l'huomo sin a 1540 dal nascere di Christo by Valerius Anshelm.

Between 1543 and 1545, Lauro established himself in various fields of specialized literature, translating works from Latin and Greek across diverse genres. Notably, he published a vernacular translation of the historical collection Della guerra troiana: this was the Italian edition of the successful pseudo-ancient anthology Auctores vetustissimi, published in 1498 by the Dominican Annius of Viterbo; in 1550, it was reissued, revised as I cinque libri de le antichità de Beroso sacerdote caldeo. He also translated other works by Greek historians, such as the De i fatti del Magno Alessandro re di Macedonia, a vernacularization of the Anabasis of Alexander by Arrian, followed by Flavius Josephus’s De l'antichità giudaiche (Antiquities of the Jews) and the Historia d'Egesippo by Saint Jerome; he then worked on agricultural texts, such as Le herbe, fiori, stirpi, che si piantano ne gli horti by Charles Estienne, and a medical text from the Corpus Hippocraticum, Opere utilissime in medicina di Polibio illustre medico. In 1546, he translated the De re aedificatoria by Leon Battista Alberti, titled I dieci libri de l'architettura. Although Lauro’s was the first vernacular translation of Alberti’s work and enjoyed some popularity, the translation that gained more recognition at the time was the subsequent one by Cosimo Bartoli, published in Florence in 1550, which completely overshadowed Lauro’s in later editions. This was due to several factors: not only was the Italian rendering of the text better and less literal, but the Tuscan edition was also better curated, featuring a good number of illustrations (absent in the Venetian version). Nonetheless, Lauro’s translation remains historically significant as the first vernacular version of the first "modern" book on architecture. Additionally, the edition, given the small size of the volume, almost considered "pocket-sized," was designed to appeal to a broader (less affluent and educated) audience than the Latin version.

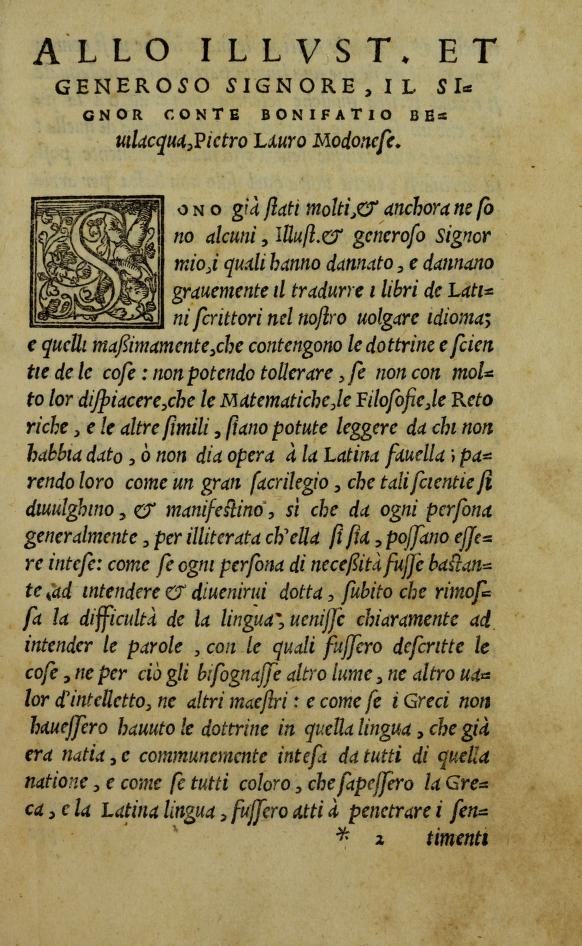
Dedication by Pietro Lauro to Count Bonifacio Bevilacqua in I dieci libri de l'architettura, his vernacularization of the De re aedificatoria by Leon Battista Alberti, published in 1546

In addition to classical languages, during the first part of his career, Lauro also translated from Spanish. The most significant of these were works of pure entertainment, such as the Historia del valorosissimo cavallier della Croce and De l'ufficio del marito, come si debba portare verso la moglie by Juan Luis Vives, dedicated to Eleanor of Toledo. Of notable historical importance during this period are the vernacular translations of two works later placed on the Index Librorum Prohibitorum: the only complete Italian translation of 1543 of the De inventoribus rerum by the humanist from Urbino, Polydore Vergil, (banned in 1557), published as De l'origine e de gl'inventori de le leggi, costumi, scientie, arti, et di tutto quello che a l'humano uso conviensi, and the first vernacular translation of the Colloquies by Erasmus of Rotterdam, printed at the workshop of the French Vincenzo Valgrisi in 1545 and reprinted four years later with revised text. The Italian translation of this work, which likely inspired Alessandro Caravia for the composition of his poem Il sogno dil Caravia, attracted the interest of many scholars, including Benedetto Croce. In the reprint, Lauro’s dedication is addressed to Renée of France, wife of Ercole II d'Este, likely at the request of the duchess herself, to align with a highly fashionable author in Europe at the time and better integrate into the intellectual élite of Ferrara.

=== Second Venetian period (1550–1568) ===
No further information about Lauro is available, possibly due to his absence from Venice, until 1550, when he published the aforementioned Beroso sacerdote caldeo. This was a vernacular translation of the 1498 text by Annius of Viterbo, Commentaria super opera diversorum auctorum de antiquitatibus loquentium, in which Annius claimed to have rediscovered lost texts attributable to Berossus. The rediscovered texts were later revealed to be forgeries, likely created ad hoc by Annius himself: it was common practice for many authors to attribute their works to the Babylonian astrologer to lend them prestige. Lauro’s translation achieved widespread success, much like the original text, so much so that the following year it was followed by an incomplete translation of the Moralia by Plutarch, titled Le piacevoli et ingeniose questioni di Plutarcho. Finally, in 1552, Tramezzino published the first book of De le lettere di m. Pietro Lauro modonese, which saw a second reprint in 1553; in 1560, a second book was published, without indication of the printer but attributable to the workshop of Comin da Trino.

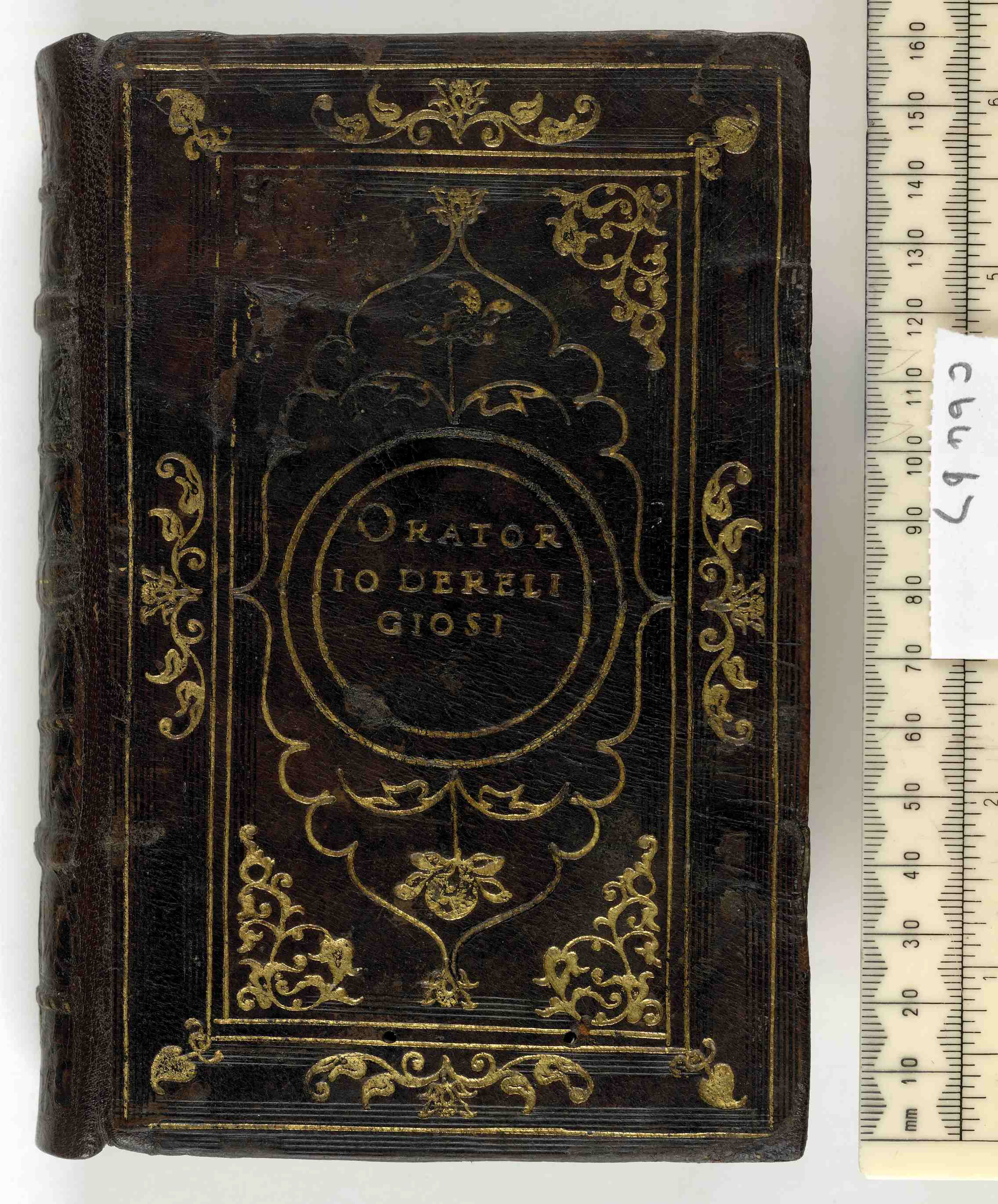
Copy of the Oratorio de religiosi, et esercitio de virtuosi translated by Lauro and published in 1555, preserved at the British Library

==== Spanish, theology, and chivalric books ====
In 1555, he returned to work for Giolito, specializing for him in translating theological and devotional texts from Spanish: two examples are the translations of works by Antonio de Guevara, such as the Oratorio de religiosi, et esercitio de virtuosi (1555) and La seconda parte del libro chiamato Monte Calvario (1556), both reprinted multiple times in subsequent years due to their popularity. These were commissioned works, followed by the Tutte l'opere del reverendo padre fra Luigi di Granata by Luis de Granada, also known as the Ghirlanda spirituale, of which he translated three volumes, published in 1568 but the result of several years’ work. The extraordinary commercial success of this collection in Italy is evidenced by over ten reprints in various formats of the same edition; this highlights Giolito’s entrepreneurial skill in meeting market expectations. For this collection, Lauro collaborated with other translators, and it was the last work published with a translation by him. Among his interests during this period was the genre of chivalric romance, begun with the translation of the Lepolemo by Alonso de Salazar from 1521, published in 1544; this version was highly successful, reaching eleven editions by 1629. After years of apparent disinterest, with no other translations of this genre published, translations of Il cavallier del Sole by Pedro Hernández de Villaumbrales as Il cavallier del Sole in 1557 and the Historia di Valeriano d'Ongaria from the Valerián de Hungría by Dionís Clemente, printed in two books by the publisher Bosello between 1558 and 1559, appeared on the Venetian publishing market. As Lauro approached his fifties, there seems to have been a renewed interest in Iberian chivalric stories by the polygraph, so much so that these were followed by the Historia delle gloriose imprese di Polendo figliuolo di Palmerino d'Oliva, published by Giglio in 1566. Although the incipit states that it is a translation from a Spanish original, it is well-known that this text was Lauro’s own work: he aimed to continue the highly successful Palmerin de Olivia series, begun in Spain in 1511. A further novel, a direct sequel to this one, was likely planned, but it was never published, likely due to the author’s death. Another translation, the Leandro il Bello, published in 1560, was previously considered an original work by Lauro, as the Spanish original was unknown, with only a 1563 Castilian edition called Leandro el Bel known. Even in 1917, the bibliographer English Henry Thomas sought to demonstrate that the differences between the two versions and the evident errors in the Spanish version were the result of a poor translation from Italian. Only in the early 2000s, the linguist Anna Bognolo rediscovered a letter by Pedro de Luján, a Spanish writer, containing the dedication of this work to Juan Claros de Guzmán, 11th Count of Niebla. From this rediscovery, the composition of Leandro is dated between 1550, the start of the author’s activity, and the death of de Guzmán in 1556.

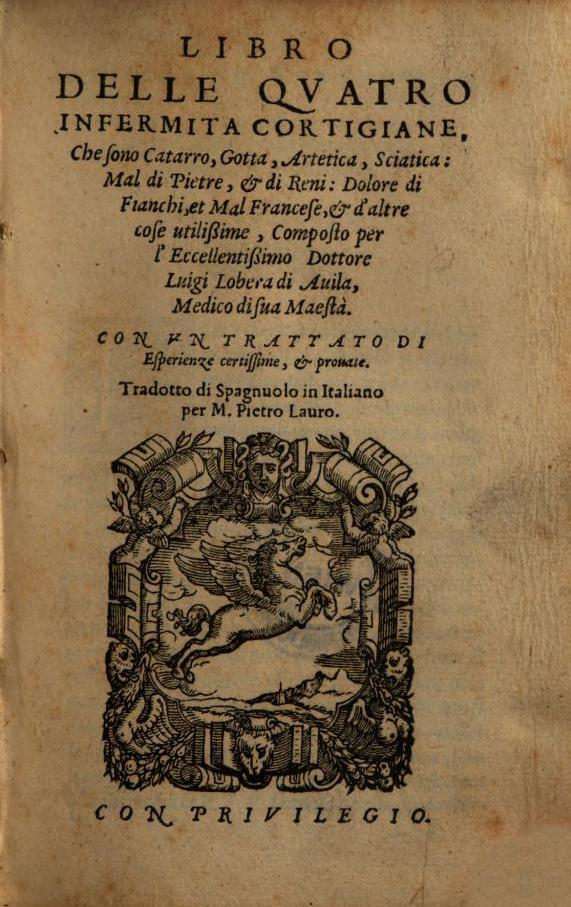
Title page of the Libro delle quatro infermità cortigiane by Luis Lobera de Ávila, translated by Lauro in 1558

The specific reasons that prompted Lauro to begin translating texts from Spanish are not clearly known, but for vernacularizers of classical languages contemporary to him, the Spanish language was considered a "gateway" to Latin: for other intellectuals like Pietro Aretino, this language was easily comprehensible (and thus translatable) for those with a good knowledge of Latin.

==== Medical texts and death ====
Between 1556 and 1559, he engaged in translations of medical and alchemical texts: the first was the Tesauro di Euonomo Filatro de rimedii secreti, a manual for the distillation of medicines, published under a pseudonym by Conrad Gessner, which in the Italian version was accompanied by a remarkable series of woodcut illustrations. This was followed by the De' secreti di natura o Della quinta essentia libri due by Ramon Llull and the De cose minerali et metalliche in 1557, followed by Niccolò Mutoni, Il luminare maggiore, utile e necessario a tutti li medici, et speciali… con un breve commento di Iacopo Manlio and, from Spanish the following year, the short work by Luis Lobera de Ávila, Libro delle quatro infermità cortigiane, che sono catarro, gotta, artetica, sciatica, mal di pietre et di reni, dolore di fianchi et mal francese, et altre cose utilissime.

He likely died in Venice in 1568 or the years immediately following, leaving his wife Gioconda and his children. The exact number of his children is unknown: according to his letters, he first had two children named Paolo and Angela, and at least two younger children named Cipriano and Concordia. Lauro also made a generic reference to other "daughters" and mentioned another son, Vincenzo, without providing further details.

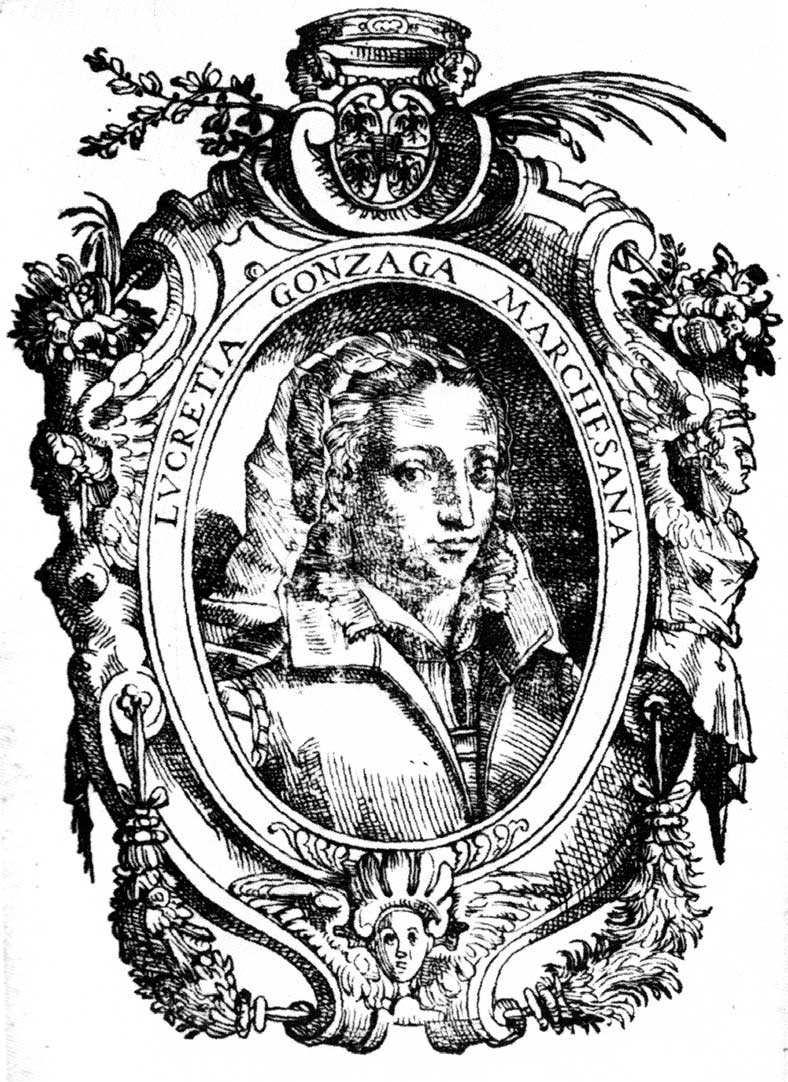
Print depicting a portrait of Lucrezia Gonzaga di Gazzuolo

== Connections with the Reformation ==
Lauro’s heterodox interests were likely influenced by contact with German reformed circles (as suggested by his letters), also hinting at interactions with those in Northern Italy, confirmed by depositions in some trials for heresy. Ambrogio Cavalli, former almoner to Renata of France, during his trial before the Inquisition in Rome, which led to his death in 1557, stated:

Pietro Lauro from Modena […] I consider him a Lutheran, but I know nothing from personal hearing, and now I cannot recall why I hold him as such, but he was in Ferrara to collect alms.

In another trial, an accused named Ettore Donati declared that “In Venice, I heard it said that Messer Lauro was infected.” In a letter dated November 11, 1561, Giovanni Domenico Roncalli, a prominent figure among the pro-Calvinist Venetians and a leader of the Protestants in Rovigo, promised Lauro to supplement the dowry of one of his unmarried daughters by 10 ducats, on the condition that she marry a young man with “knowledge of the true faith.” Roncalli formalized this commitment in his will drawn up shortly after, in the same year, 1561. Lauro was also on excellent terms with Ortensio Lando: the latter, who was close to Lucrezia Gonzaga di Gazzuolo for a period, convinced her to write to the Modenese polygraph. Given the suspicions and accusations of heresy that the noblewoman and scholar aroused during her life, some allusions in Lauro’s letters to “many troubles that have kept me in quite unpleasant exercise” and to his “affairs” that caused concern to his correspondent may have stemmed from a fear of attracting the attention of the Inquisition through his correspondence. In these same letters, he also confessed to being afraid of leaving the Venetian Republic for religious reasons, stating that those who left the state were “suspended and doubtful.”

The polygraph’s beliefs also influenced his translations, in which some passages were deliberately altered in Italian to better align with reformed ideals. An example can be found in the De inventoribus rerum by Polydore Vergil, where an entire chapter was completely modified and censored: while the original author intended to advocate for the confirmation of celibacy for priests and presbyters, Lauro omitted some sentences and reversed the meaning of others to suggest and promote an ideal closer to the preachings of Martin Luther.

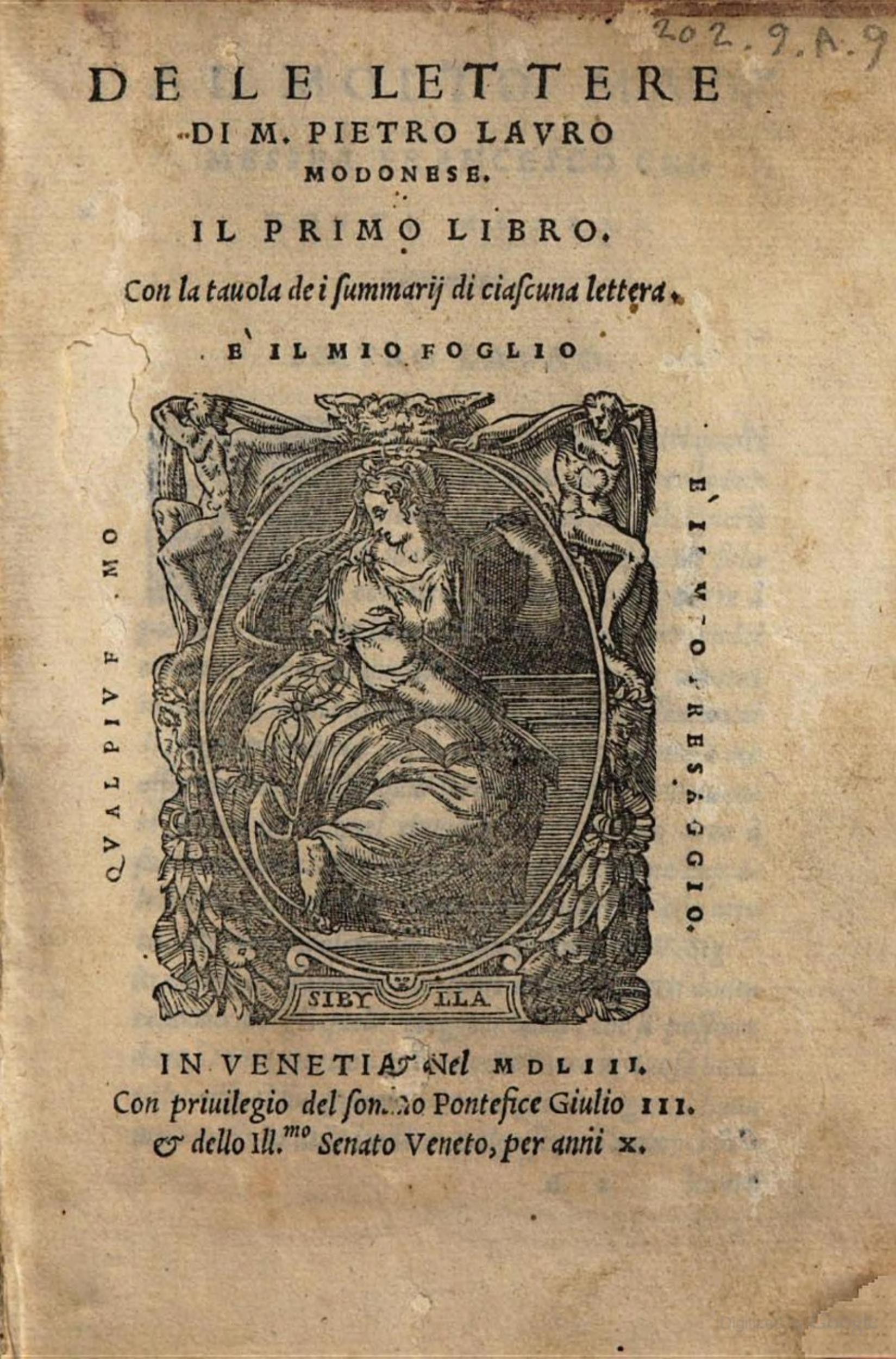
Title page of the book De le lettere di M. Pietro Lauro modonese, published in 1553

== Epistolary works ==
Lauro became famous in his time for two books containing his correspondences and letters, printed respectively in 1552 (with a second reprint in 1553) and in 1560 by Giolito and Comin da Trino. It is thanks to these texts that his numerous contacts with some of the major exponents of Italian humanism are known, both those residing in Venice, such as Lazarus Buonamici, Natale Conti, and Sebastiano Erizzo, and those living in other cities of the peninsula, such as Luca Contile. Other letters were addressed to his publishers or to theologians, most of whom were Dominican friars from the convent of the Basilica of Saints John and Paul, where Remigio Nannini took vows during that period. About half of the letters were addressed to foreigners, mostly Germans, confirming his association with reformed circles. The content of the epistolary exchanges ranged from matters concerning morality and politics, but also economics, the arts, personal matters, and society. The collection is not arranged chronologically but by “concepts”: Lauro sought to organize them by topic, attempting to group them to outline his ideals; however, this arrangement makes the work not always coherent or continuous.

The collection has a didactic structure, as evidenced by the absence of tables listing the recipients’ names; however, there is an index of the topics covered in each letter. From these, not only can valuable information about Lauro’s life and personality be gleaned, but also about the various recipients and senders of the letters, thanks to the frequent revelation of their ideals and concerns. According to Ireneo Sanesi, the work may actually be a fictional epistolary and a rhetorical exercise, imitating the Paradossi by Ortensio Lando. This is suggested by how Lauro responded to Lucrezia Gonzaga di Gazzuolo, comforting her for the loss of her husband Giampaolo Manfrone, and how she, in turn, responded in highly laudatory tones toward the Modenese. According to Sanesi, the letters from Gonzaga herself were likely written by Lando, given the similarities in language with the works of the Milanese humanist.

These exchanges of correspondence are also significant in the context of religion: they reveal many connections between intellectuals of the time suspected of harboring reformist sympathies. Among the notable figures in the collections are Girolamo Molin, Nicolò Da Ponte, Jacopo Zane, Giorgio Gradenigo, the aforementioned Erizzo and Contile, and, above all, Domenico Venier, one of the most suspected of sympathizing with reformist currents.

The polygraph wrote to his friend Sebastiano Fausto that he was not convinced about publishing the collection, as he was unsure of the actual interest it would garner. The first book was dedicated to the Florentine nobleman Francesco Chimenti, while the second was dedicated to the German banker Johann Jakob Fugger, a member of the Fugger family and nephew of Anton Fugger. The latter distinguished himself with almost reckless patronage, which led to the financial ruin of the family business, while supporting Lauro and some of his intellectual friends financially.

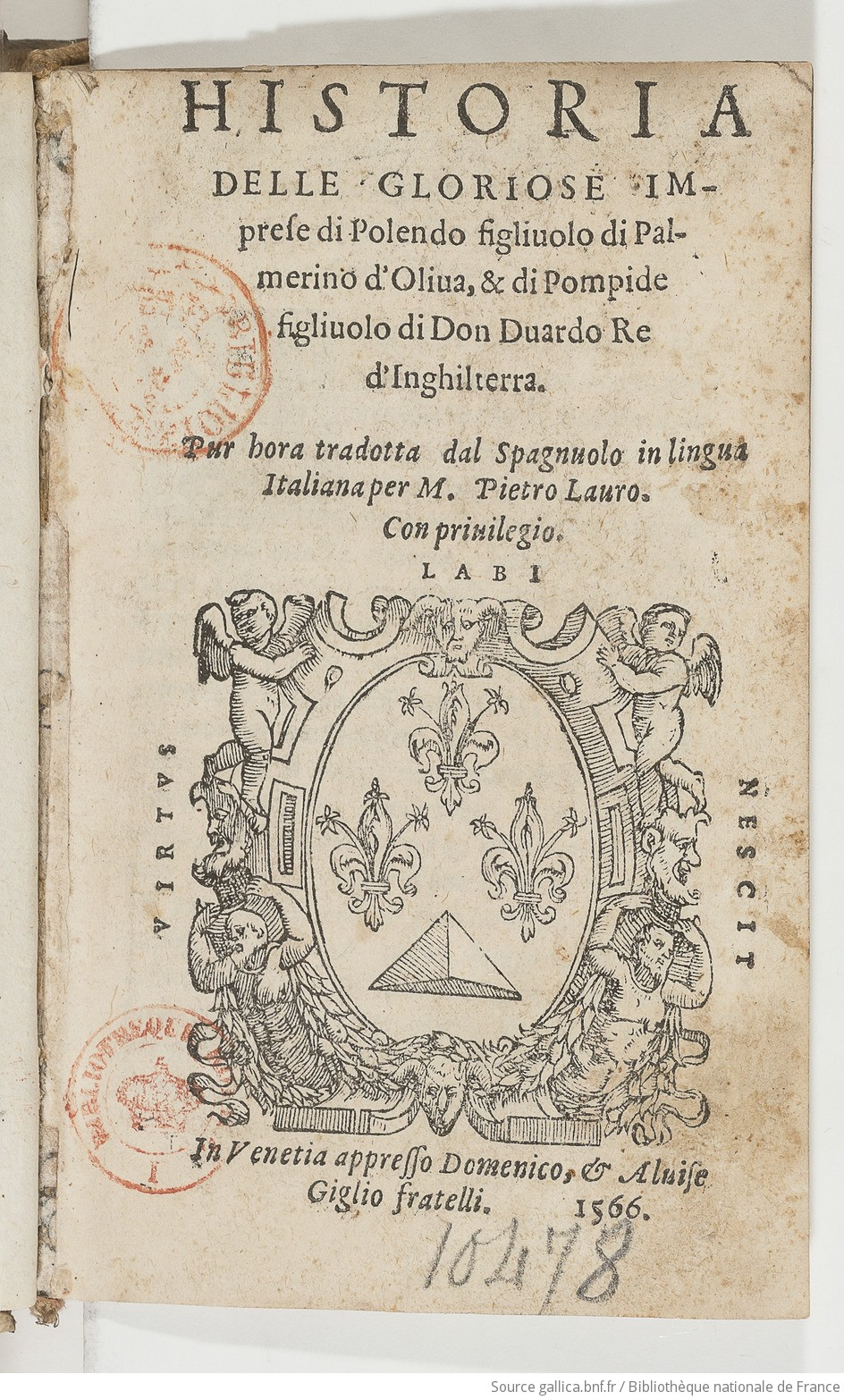
Title page of the Historia delle gloriose impresi di Polendo, figliuolo di Palmerino di Oliva, e di Pompide figliuolo di don Duardo re d'Inghilterra

== Polendo ==
Historia delle gloriose impresi di Polendo, figliuolo di Palmerino di Oliva, e di Pompide figliuolo di don Duardo re d'Inghilterra, more commonly known by its abbreviated title Polendo after one of its protagonists, is a chivalric romance written by Lauro and published in 1566. It is a continuation of the Primaleón by Francisco Vázquez (writer), the second book in the Iberian cycle of the Palmerins, as well as the last book in the cycle overall.

The story recounts the heroic deeds and adventures of many characters: Polendo, son of Primaleon and king of Thessaly, sets out to rescue his kidnapped son Franciano, leaving his homeland, where his wife Francelina is killed during his absence. He remarries the princess of Armenia, Diamantina, after rescuing his son and avenging his first wife. Meanwhile, Pompide discovers he is the illegitimate son of Don Duardos, king of England, and sets out to find him to persuade him to become a knight. Upon reaching Scotland, he falls in love with Queen Drusilla and, after saving her from a kidnapping, marries her, fathering a son named Ricadoro. From here, the stories of other characters, either drawn from previous books or entirely invented by Lauro, begin to be told, following the growth of the two sons, Franciano and Ricadoro, in their first adventures as knights.

Despite some inconsistencies with the other books, the Polendo showcases Lauro’s narrative abilities for the first time outside the realm of translation. Likely inspired by the success of the series (of which he translated some books), his handling of characters is particularly appreciated: the book features an intricate interplay of stories involving a considerable number of protagonists, forming a highly complex narrative. This was achieved by drawing on ideas from other titles in the Palmerins cycle; he is also credited with developing and deepening the stories of some characters who were present but neglected in other stories. Lauro intended to produce a second part to his work, as mentioned multiple times throughout the text and in the conclusion, where it is written:

A matter of great turmoil occurred, that Ricadoro, upon seeing Solabella, was so taken with her charming appearance that he unwittingly fell in love, and she, seeing the young man who surpassed not only Platir but even herself in beauty, felt her heart pierced by the arrow of love. Platir seemed to notice this, with great distress, so that all three were left confused, and from this arose great turmoil among Christians, as will be told in the second part of this story.

— Polendo, chapter 101

Lauro never published the continuation of the story, possibly due to his death in 1568, which occurred two years after the publication of Polendo.

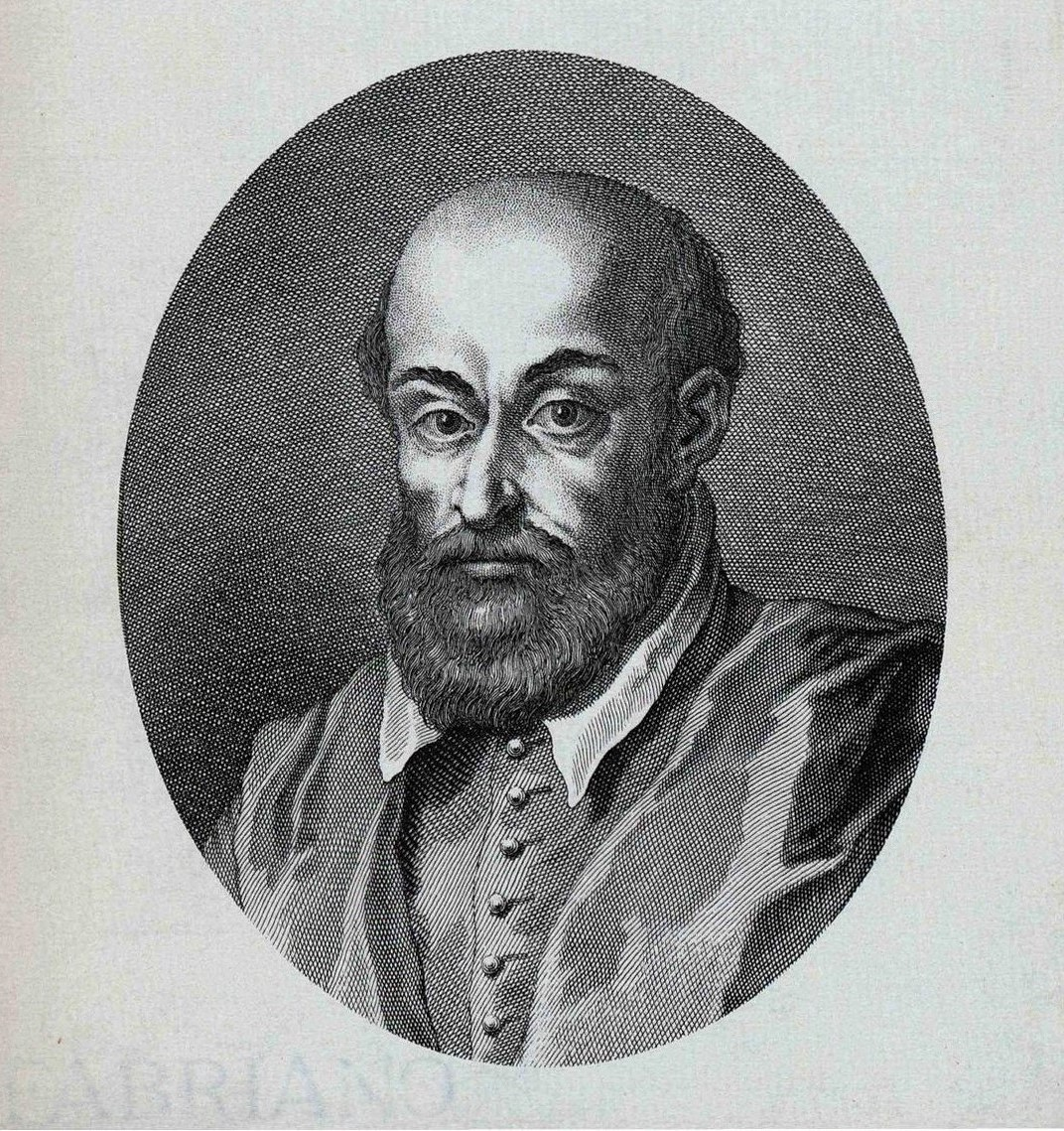
Engraving from 1727 depicting Lodovico Castelvetro, a philologist of the 16th century

== Translations ==
Lauro’s translations elicited mixed judgments, so much so that even during his lifetime, numerous criticisms were raised regarding his works. Castelvetro states that he “dared to translate Columella and other Latin authors,” despite knowing only the rudiments of the Latin language. Even Tiraboschi in the 18th century, while attempting to defend the Modenese’s position and work, admitted that despite his vast output, Lauro likely did not possess a particularly extensive education: this can be inferred both from the trivial errors made in simple translations and from those in the exposition of certain concepts. According to George Francis Hill, an American numismatist who cataloged the medal bearing the only known portrait of Lauro, this inadequacy is represented on the medal itself. Indeed, the reverse bears the inscription:

May the tongues that unjustly wounded like vipers be struck by death

— Ceda(n)tur a morte inique lacessentes lingue viperibus similes

According to Hill, this would be a reference to the poor quality of his translations. In the 16th century, however, prominent figures such as Lucrezia Gonzaga and Ortensio Lando praised him, describing him as an elegant and refined writer, but these opinions may have been biased by their personal acquaintance with the individual in question.

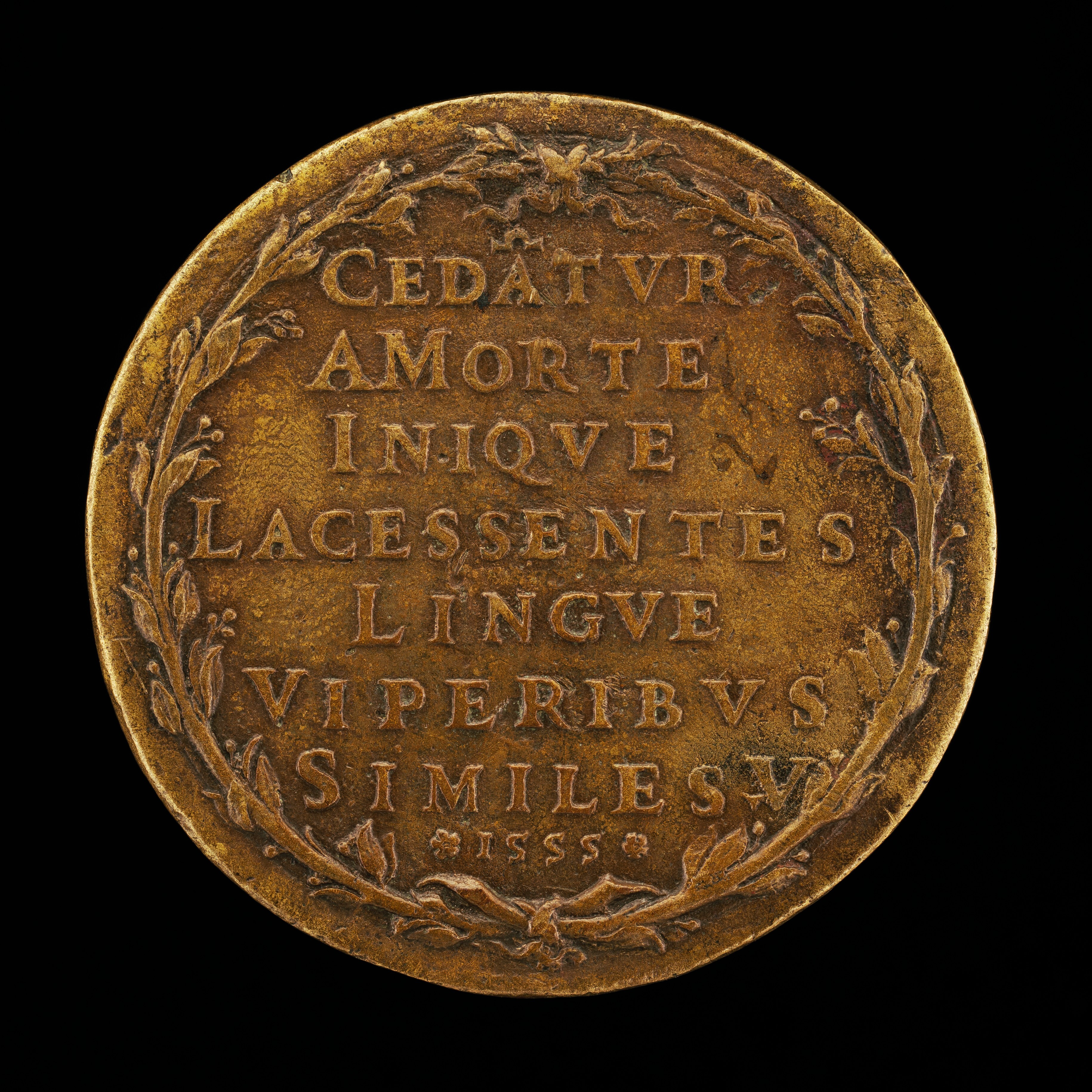
The reverse of the medal by Vittoria featuring Lauro’s portrait: here is the inscription Ceda(n)tur A Morte Inique Lacessentes Lingue Viperibus Similes. The capital letters spell out the name Camillus V.

=== Repercussions ===
Modern scholars tend to be more lenient toward Lauro’s work: he had to work tirelessly to secure as many texts as possible from the publishers-printers of the time, often translating multiple works simultaneously under exhausting workloads. His employers, who imposed tight deadlines, required translations to cater to public tastes, overlooking the quality and revision that a literary work would typically require. Moreover, for years after the invention of printing, translators received no protections whatsoever.

For this reason, in some works, such as the Colloquia familiaria, his attempts to make certain terms and expressions used by Erasmus of Rotterdam more familiar to the Venetian public are appreciated, employing vocabulary, proverbs, and idioms distinctly characteristic of Northeastern Italy or word forms that, while not entirely correct, were designed to facilitate understanding due to their descriptive function, as well as the simplification of complex themes through streamlined reformulations, omitting accessory descriptions to make the text leaner and the reading smoother. Even some of his deliberately partial and voluntary changes have been described as functional within the broader context of his work.

As his texts were aimed not only at the Venetian aristocracy but also at the newly enriched class that did not know Latin, these works decisively contributed to the dissemination of knowledge of both classical texts and scientific knowledge, thanks to the use of a popular-toned language. He is also credited with a certain dexterity in tackling very diverse topics, as well as a keen sense of selection in personally choosing the titles to translate.

Nevertheless, the deliberate omissions of even important parts of the original text, not included in his adaptations or even censored and the literal translations of entire pages, which make some passages awkward, imprecise, and relegated to the background despite their importance in the original work, remain the subject of negative scrutiny by scholars today.

== Works ==
=== Original works ===
- Petri Lauri Mutinensis Preludium ad copiam dicendi, ubi et obiter muliebre ingenium mobile et varium, porut [sic] copia dicendi potuit, exprimitur. Venetiis, mensis Iunij, Giolito, 1539.
- De le lettere di m. Pietro Lauro modonese. Il primo libro. Con la tavola de i summarij di ciascuna lettera, Tramezzino, 1552.
- Delle lettere di messer Pietro Lauro. Libro secondo. Con la tavola de i summarij di ciascuna lettera, Comin da Trino, 1560.
- Historia delle gloriose imprese di Polendo figliuolo di Palmerino d’Oliua, et di Pompide figliuolo di don Duardo re d’Inghilterra. Pur hora tradotta dal spagnuolo in lingua italiana per m. Pietro Lauro, Giglio, 1566.

=== Translations and vernacularizations ===
- Artemidoro Daldiano philosofo eccellentissimo Dell’interpretatione de sogni novamente di greco in volgare tradotto per Pietro Lauro modonese, Giolito, 1542. Translation of Oneirocritica by Artemidorus.
- Costantino Cesare De notevoli et utilissimi ammaestramenti dell’agricoltura di greco in volgare tradotto per Pietro Lauro modonese, con la tauola di tutto ciò che nell’opera si comprende, Giolito, 1542. Translation of the Geoponica by Cassianus Bassus.
- Chronica di Giovanni Carione con mirabile artificio composta, nella quale comprendesi il computo de gli anni, i mutamenti ne i regni e nella religione, et altri grandissimi successi. Nuovamente tradotta in volgare per Pietro Lauro modonese, Tramezzino, 1543. Translation of the Chronica by Johann Carion.
- Il disprezzo del mondo opera bellissima et utile e necessaria a cadauno christiano novamente di latino in volgar tradotta, per Pietro Lauro modonese con la tauola de tutte le materie e capitoli che sono ne l’opera, Comin da Trino, 1543. Translation of the De miseria humanae conditionis by Lotario dei Conti di Segni.
- Ditte Candiano della guerra Troiana. Darete Frigio della rovina Troiana. Declamatione di Libanio Sofista. Marsilio Lesbio dell’origine d’Italia, e de i Tirreni. Archiloco de tempi. Beroso dell’antichità. Manethone de i re d’Egitto. Methastene Persiano del giudicio de tempi, et annuali historie de Persiani. Quinto Fabio Pittore dell’Aurea età, e dell’origine di Roma, Valgrisi, 1543. Translation of the Auctores vetustissimi by Annius of Viterbo.
- Polydoro Virgilio di Urbino De la origine e de gl’inventori de le leggi, costumi, scientie, arti, et di tutto quello che a l’humano uso conuiensi, con la espositione dil Pater nostro, ogni cosa di latino in volgar tradotto da Pietro Lauro modonese, con la tauola di ciò che si contiene ne l’opera, Giolito, 1543. Translation of the De inventoribus rerum by Polydore Vergil.
- Arriano di Nicomedia, chiamato nuovo Xenofonte de i fatti del Magno Alessandro re di Macedonia. Nuovamente di greco tradotto in italiano per Pietro Lauro modonese, Tramezzino, 1544. Translation of the Anabasis of Alexander by Arrian.
- Lucio Giunio Moderato Columella De l’agricoltura libri XII. Trattato de gli alberi del medesimo, tradotto nuovamente di latino in lingua italiana per Pietro Lauro Modonese, Tramezzino, 1544. Translation of the De re rustica by Columella.
- Giosefo De l’antichità giudaiche. Tradotto in italiano per m. Pietro Lauro modonese, Cesano, 1544. Translation of the Antiquities of the Jews by Flavius Josephus.
- Historia d’Egesippo tra i christiani scrittori antichissimo de le valorose imprese fatte da giudei ne l’assedio di Gierusaleme, e come fu abbattuta quella città, e molte altre del paese, breve somma del medesimo di quanto è compreso ne l’opera. Tradotta di latino il italiano per Pietro Lauro modonese, Tramezzino, 1544. Translation from Saint Jerome.
- Catalogo de gli anni et principi da la creatione de l’huomo, sin’à 1540 dal nascere di Christo, opera quanto dir si possa utilissima, per Valerio Anselmo Raid composta, e nuovamente di latino in volgare tradotta, per Pietro Lauro modonese, Tramezzino, 1544. According to Tiraboschi, this is likely an original work by Lauro.
- Historia del valorosissimo Cavallier de la Croce, che per sue gran prodezze fu a l’imperio de Alemagna soblimato. Tratta nuovamente da l’idioma spagnuolo in lingua italiana, Tramezzino, 1544. Translation of the Lepolemo by Alonso de Salazar.
- Opere utilissime in medicina di Polibio illustre medico, descepolo et successo d’Hippocrate Coo, tradotte nuovamente di greco in italiano, per Pietro Lauro modonese, Comin da Trino, 1545. Translation of the works of Polybus.
- Colloqui famigliari di Erasmo Roterodamo ad ogni qualità di parlare et spetialmente a cose pietose accomodati. Tradotti di latino in italiano, per m. Pietro Lauro modonese, Valgrisi, 1545. Translation of the Colloquia familiaria by Erasmus of Rotterdam.
- Di Carlo Stefano le herbe, fiori, stirpi, che si piantano ne gli horti, con le voci loro più proprie et accomodate. Aggiuntovi un libretto di coltivare gli horti, tradotto in italiano per Pietro Lauro modonese, Valgrisi, 1545. Translation of the Seminarium, et plantarum fructiferarum praesertim arborum quae post hortos conseri solent by Charles Estienne.
- Di Carlo Stephano seminario over plantario de gli alberi che si piantano con i loro nomi et de’ frutti parimente. Aggiuntovi l’arbusto, il fonticello, e’l spinetto, de l’istesso autore. Tradotti in lingua italiana, per Pietro Lauro modonese, Valgrisi, 1545. Translation of the Seminarium, et plantarum fructiferarum praesertim arborum quae post hortos conseri solent by Charles Estienne.
- Vineto di Carlo Stefano nel quale brevemente si narrano i nomi latini antichi, et volgari delle viti, e delle uve. Raccolto ogni cosa da gli antichi scrittori, e accomodat’a questo nostro uso di hoggi di, Valgrisi, 1545. Translation of the Vinetum by Charles Estienne.
- Dell’vfficio del marito verso la moglie, dell’institutione della femina christiana, uergine, maritata, o vedova, et dello ammaestrare i fanciulli nelle arti liberali. Opera veramente non pur dilettevole ma anco utilissima, Valgrisi, 1546. Translation of the De institutione feminae Christianae by Juan Luis Vives.
- I dieci libri de l’architettura di Leon Battista de gli Alberti fiorentino, huomo in ogni altra dottrina eccellente, ma in questa singolare; da la cui prefatione brevemente si comprende la commodità, l’utilità, la necessità, e la dignità di tale opera, e parimente la cagione, da la quale è stato molto a scriverla: Novamente da la latina ne la Volgar lingua con molta diligentia tradotti, Valgrisi, 1546. Translation of the De re aedificatoria by Leon Battista Alberti.
- I cinque libri delle antichità de Beroso sacerdote caldeo con lo commento di Giovanni Annio di Viterbo. Con lo commento di Giovanni Annio di Viterbo teologo eccellentissimo. Il numero de gli altri autori che trattano de la antichità si legge ne la seguente pagina. Tradotti hora pur in Italiano per Pietro Lauro Modonese, Baldissera Constantini, 1550. Vernacularization of the Commentaria super opera diversorum auctorum de antiquitatibus loquentium by Annius of Viterbo, based on a forgery by the author of a work by Berossus.
- Le piacevoli et ingeniose questioni di Plutarcho, trattate in varii et diversi conviti d’huomini di raro intelletto de la Grecia, nuovamente tradotte in volgare per Pietro Lauro Modenese, Comin da Trino, 1551. Translation of the Moralia by Plutarch.
- Oratorio de religiosi, et esercitio de virtuosi composto dal reverendo monsignor don Antonio di Guevara. Di nuovo tradotto di spagnuolo in italiano per Pietro Lauro, Giolito, 1555. Translation of the Oratorio de religiosos y exercicio de virtuosos compuesto por el illustre señor don Antonio de Guevara by Antonio de Guevara.
- Tesauro di Euonomo Filatro de rimedii secreti. Lib. fisico et medicinale, et in parte chimico et economico, cerca’ l preparare i rimedij, et sapori diversi, sommamente necessario a tutti i medici, et speciali. Aggiuntovi molte, et diverse figure de fornaci. Tradotto di latino in italiano, per m. Pietro Lauro, Sessa, 1556. Translation of the De secretis remediis by Conrad Gessner.
- La seconda parte del libro chiamato Monte Calvario che espone le sette parole, che disse Christo in sù la Croce. Composto dall’illustre sig. don Antonio di Guevara, vescovo di Modognetto. Tradotto nuovamente di spagnuolo in italiano per m. Pietro Lauro. Con tre tavole, la prima è de’ capitoli, la seconda delle autorità, figure et profetie, esposte dall’autore, et la terza delle cose notabili, che in tutta l’opera si contengono, Giolito, 1556. Translation of the La segunda parte del libro llamado Monte Calvario. Compuesto por el reverendísimo señor don Antonio de Guevara de buena memoria, obispo que fue de Mondoñedo by Antonio de Guevara.
- Il cavallier del sole, che con l’arte militare dipinge la peregrinatione della vita humana ... Tradotto nuovamente di spagnuolo in italiano per messer Pietro Lauro, Sessa, 1557. Translation of the El caballero del Sol by Pedro Hernández de Villaumbrales.
- Raimondo Lullo Maiorico filosofo acutissimo, et celebre medico De’ secreti di natura, ò Della quinta essentia. Libri due. Alberto Magno sommo filosofo, de cose minerali, et metalliche. Libri cinque. Il tutto tradotto da m. Pietro Lauro, Sessa, 1557. Translation of various works by Ramon Llull.
- Libro delle quatro infermità cortigiane, che sono catarro, gotta, artetica, sciatica, mal di pietre, et di reni, dolore di fianchi, et mal francese, et d’altre cose utilissime, composto per l’eccellentissimo dottore Luigi Lobera di Avila ... Con vn trattato di esperienze certissime, et provate. Tradotto di spagnuolo in italiano per m. Pietro Lauro, Sessa, 1558. Translation of the Libro de las quatro enfermedades cortesanas (catarro o rheuma, la gota, la calculosis renal y la sífilis o mal de bubas, que era considerado el más cortesano de todos los males) by Luis Lobera de Ávila.
- Historia di Valeriano d’Ongaria nella quale si trattano le alte imprese di cavalleria fatte da Pasmerindo re d’Ongaria per amor della ... prencipessa Alberitia, Bosello, 1558. Translation of the Valerián de Hungría by Dionís Clemente.
- Luminare maggiore, utile et necessario a tutti li medici, et speciali, raccolto da Nicolo Mutoni medico da molti eccellentissimi medici con vn breve commento di Jacopo Manlio; et il lume et il tesoro de speciali. Nuovamente tradotti in lingua volgare per Pietro Lauro et da molti errori espurgati, Bariletto, 1559. Translation of texts by Niccolò Mutoni.
- Leandro il Bello, Tramezzino, 1560. Translation of the Leandro el Bel by Pedro de Luján, previously considered an original work.
- Fiori di consolatione ad ogni fedel christiano necessarii, a passare l’onde di queste miserie humane, senza rimaner sommerso. Con i rimedi ad ogni infirmità spirituale composti delle sententie della Sacra Scrittura, et de’ santi dottori catolici. Raccolti dal reverendo padre fra Tomaso di Valenza, dell’ordine di San Domenico, et tradotti dallo spagnolo per m. Pietro Lauro Modonese, Giolito, 1562. Translation of texts by Tomás de Villanueva.
- Trattato dell’oratione et devotione, del r. p. fra Luigi di Granata... Nuovamente tradotto di spagnuolo in italiano da m. Pietro Lauro... E questo è il quarto fiore della nostra ghirlanda spirituale, Giolito, 1564. Translation of texts by Luis de Granada.
- Devotissime meditationi per i giorni della settimana tanto per la mattina come per la sera. Composte dal r.p.f. Luigi di Granata dell’Ordine de’ padri predicatori... Nuovamente tradotta da Pietro Lauro modonese ... Questo è il terzo fiore della nostra Ghirlanda spirituale., Giolito, 1568. Translation of texts by Luis de Granada.
- Tutte l’opere del r. padre fra Luigi di Granata dell’Ordine di san Domenico. Nelle quali con molto fervor di spirito, con gran dottrina, et con incredibile facilità, s’ammaestra un cristiano di quanto gli può far bisogno, dal principio della sua conversione fino alla perfezione. Nuovamente tradotte di spagnuolo in italiano da diversi autori, e con molta diligentia riviste, et adornate di postille, che mostrano le sententie più, Giolito, 1568. Translation of texts by Luis de Granada.

== Bibliography ==
- "Alberti, I dieci libri de l'architettura... 1546". La biblioteca dell'architetto del Rinascimento [The Library of the Renaissance Architect]. Biblioteca Universitaria di Padova. Archived from the original on 2024-08-04.
- "La Rinascita dell'architettura Antica - 1485". Classici Italiani [Italian Classics]. Associazione librai antiquari d’Italia. 2020-12-10. Archived from the original on 2024-06-25.
- Bazzaco, Stefano (2018). "El caso del Leandro el Bel, sobre la dudosa autoría de un libro de caballerías" [The Case of Leandro el Bel, on the Doubtful Authorship of a Chivalric Book] (PDF). Trayectorias literarias hispánicas: Redes, irradiaciones y confluencias (in Spanish). Rome: Associazione Ispanisti Italiani: 157–173. Archived (PDF) from the original on 2024-03-28.
- Bombardini, Monica (2014). "El Polendo de Pietro Lauro: un heredero italiano de Palmerín" [The Polendo by Pietro Lauro: An Italian Heir to Palmerín]. Historias Fingidas (in Spanish) (2). University of Verona: 173–183. doi:10.13136/2284-2667/21. Archived from the original on 2024-11-11.
- Breman, Paul (2002). "Alberti, Leon Battista". Books on Military Architecture Printed in Venice [Books on Military Architecture Printed in Venice]. pp. 17–21. doi:10.1163/9789004473874_009. ISBN 978-90-04-47387-4. Archived from the original on 2025-03-05.
- Campetella, Moreno (2018). "L'horticulture et le jardinage en France et en Italie au xvie siècle: le cas des manuels de techniques horticoles de Charles Estienne (1536) et des traductions italiennes de Pietro Lauro (1545)" [Horticulture and Gardening in France and Italy in the 16th Century: The Case of Charles Estienne’s Horticultural Manuals (1536) and Pietro Lauro’s Italian Translations (1545)]. Cahiers d'études italiennes (in French) (27). University of Grenoble: 1–22. doi:10.4000/cei.5174. Archived from the original on 2023-12-29.
- Campetella, Moreno (2020). "Les néologismes techniques dans le traité Della cultura degli orti e giardini (1588–1596) de Giovanvettorio Soderini" [Technical Neologisms in the Treatise Della cultura degli orti e giardini (1588–1596) by Giovanvettorio Soderini]. ELAD – SILDA Études de Linguistique et d'Analyse des Discourses (in French) (1). Prairial: 1–53. Archived from the original on 2024-09-10.
- Cosentino, Paola (2001). "Leon Battista Alberti, De re aedificatoria" [Leon Battista Alberti, De re aedificatoria]. Italica. Rai International Online. Archived from the original on 2007-11-14.
- Creus Visiers, Eduardo (2000). "Traducciones italianas de Antonio Guevara durante el siglo XVI" [Italian Translations of Antonio de Guevara in the 16th Century]. Boletín de la Biblioteca de Menéndez Pelayo (in Spanish): 515–538. Archived from the original on 2025-02-05.
- Croce, Benedetto (1922). Nuove curiosità storiche [New Historical Curiosities]. Naples: Riccardo Ricciardi editore.
- Del Cengio, Martina (2020). Le Rime di Girolamo Molin (1500–1569) e la poesia veneziana del Cinquecento [The Poems of Girolamo Molin (1500–1569) and Venetian Poetry of the 16th Century]. Pisa: Scuola Normale Superiore.
- Del Gaudio, Ilenia (2023). "Il sogno dil Caravia: redenzione e idee di riforma in un dialogo poetico di metà Cinquecento" [The Dream of Caravia: Redemption and Reform Ideas in a Mid-16th-Century Poetic Dialogue] (PDF). Sinestesieonline (39). Avellino: Associazione Culturale Internazionale Edizioni Sinestesie: 1–16. Archived (PDF) from the original on 2023-09-24.
- Demattè, Paola (2017-05-10). "Imaginarios, usos y representaciones de los libros de caballerías" [Imagery, Uses, and Representations of Chivalric Books]. Istituto Italiano di Cultura Bogotá (in Spanish). Bogotá. Archived from the original on 2025-01-07.
- Dini, Gabriele (2005). "LAURO, Pietro". Dizionario Biografico degli Italiani [Biographical Dictionary of Italians]. Vol. VI. Istituto della Enciclopedia Italiana.
- Dumas-Reungoat, Christine (2012-12-31). "Bérose, de l'emprunt au faux" [Berossus, from Borrowing to Forgery]. Kentron. Revue pluridisciplinaire du monde antique (in French). 28: 159–186. Archived from the original on 2023-12-04.
- Hill, George Francis (1917). "Notes on Italian Medals-XXIII" [Notes on Italian Medals-XXIII]. The Burlington Magazine for Connoisseurs. 30 (170): 190–198. JSTOR 860425. Archived from the original on 2024-12-24.
- Lemerle, Frédérique (2016). "De re aedificatoria". Architectura [Architecture]. Tours: University of Tours. Archived from the original on 2024-09-09.
- Lodone, Michele (2010). "Traduzioni, censure, riscritture: sul De inventoribus di Polidoro Virgilio" [Translations, Censorship, Rewritings: On Polydore Vergil’s De inventoribus] (PDF). Annali della Scuola Normale Superiore di Pisa. 1 (2). Pisa: Scuola Normale Superiore: 143–177. Archived (PDF) from the original on 2022-07-07.
- Malaguti, Marta (2012). Pietro Lauro, traduttore dei Colloquia erasmiani [Pietro Lauro, Translator of Erasmus’s Colloquia]. University of Rome La Sapienza. Archived from the original on 2025-03-28.
- Krebs, Christopher B. (2011). A Most Dangerous Book. Tacitus's Germania from the Roman Empire to the Third Reich. New York: W. W. Norton & Company.
- "Inscription in a Laurel Wreath [reverse]". National Gallery of Art. Archived from the original on 2019-07-22.
- "Pietro Lauro, born 1508, Modenese Poet and Scholar [obverse]". National Gallery of Art. Archived from the original on 2019-07-22.
- Neri, Stefano (2007). "«El Cautivo de la Cruz» L'infanzia dell'eroe fra romanzo cavalleresco e novela de cautivos nel Lepolemo (Valencia, 1521)" [«El Cautivo de la Cruz» The Hero’s Childhood Between Chivalric Romance and Captivity Novel in Lepolemo (Valencia, 1521)]. Monographica: El mundo ibérico e Italia (7). University of Turin: 36–50. Archived from the original on 2022-10-17.
- Rizzi, Andrea (2020). Renaissance Translators, Transnational Literature and Intertraffique. Liverpool: Liverpool University Press. pp. 47–60. doi:10.2307/j.ctv2tjdgsp.7. Archived from the original on 2025-02-05.
- Sanesi, Ireneo (1894-01-01). "Tre epistolarii del Cinquecento" [Three Epistolaries of the 16th Century]. Giornale Storico della Letteratura Italiana. 24 (1). Turin: 1–32.
- Schiavon, Chiara (2009). "Una via d'accesso agli epistolari. Le dediche dei libri di lettere d'autore nel Cinquecento. Prima parte" [An Access Route to Epistolaries. The Dedications of Authorial Letter Books in the 16th Century. First Part.] (PDF). Margini - Giornale della Dedica e Altro (3). Basel: University of Basel: 3–48. Archived (PDF) from the original on 2024-07-21.
- Simonetta, Elisabetta (2017). Lucrezia Gonzaga et Ortensio Lando. Enjeux et contraintes d'un camouflage épistolaire (1552) [Lucrezia Gonzaga and Ortensio Lando. Issues and Constraints of an Epistolary Camouflage (1552)] (PDF) (in French). Paris: Université Paris-Cité.
- Stephens, Walter (2011). "Complex Pseudonymity: Annius of Viterbo's Multiple Persona Disorder". MLN. 126 (4): 689–708. doi:10.1353/mln.2011.0077. JSTOR 41300837. Archived from the original on 2024-10-08.
- Tiraboschi, Girolamo (1783). "LAURO PIETRO Modenese". Biblioteca modenese ovvero notizie della vita e delle opere degli scrittori nati negli stati del duca di Modena [Modenese Library or Notices on the Life and Works of Writers Born in the States of the Duke of Modena]. Vol. III. Modena. pp. 76–81.
- Tomasi, Giulia (2024). "La investidura caballeresca: tradición y traducción de un pasaje iniciático en los libros de caballerías españoles del siglo XVI" [Chivalric Investiture: Tradition and Translation of an Initiatory Passage in Spanish Chivalric Books of the 16th Century]. Revista de Filología Románica (in Spanish). 41 (41). Complutense University of Madrid: 133–142. Archived from the original on 2024-08-27.
- Torboli, Micaela (2010). "Erasmo da Rotterdam alla corte di Ferrara" [Erasmus of Rotterdam at the Court of Ferrara]. Ferrara - Voci di una Città. 6 (32). Ferrara: Fondazione Estense. Archived from the original on 2025-02-04.
- Valente, Michela (2021-10-24). "Il seme fecondo dell'eresia" [The Fertile Seed of Heresy]. La Lettura. Milan: Corriere della Sera. Archived from the original on 2024-11-26.
- "Pietro Lauro - Medal 1555 (made)". Victoria and Albert Museum. 2009-06-24. Archived from the original on 2025-02-20.
