= Giovan Antonio Rusconi =

Giovan Antonio Rusconi (c. 1500–05; † 1578) was a Venetian architect, hydraulic engineer, translator and illustrator of Vitruvius.

== Life ==
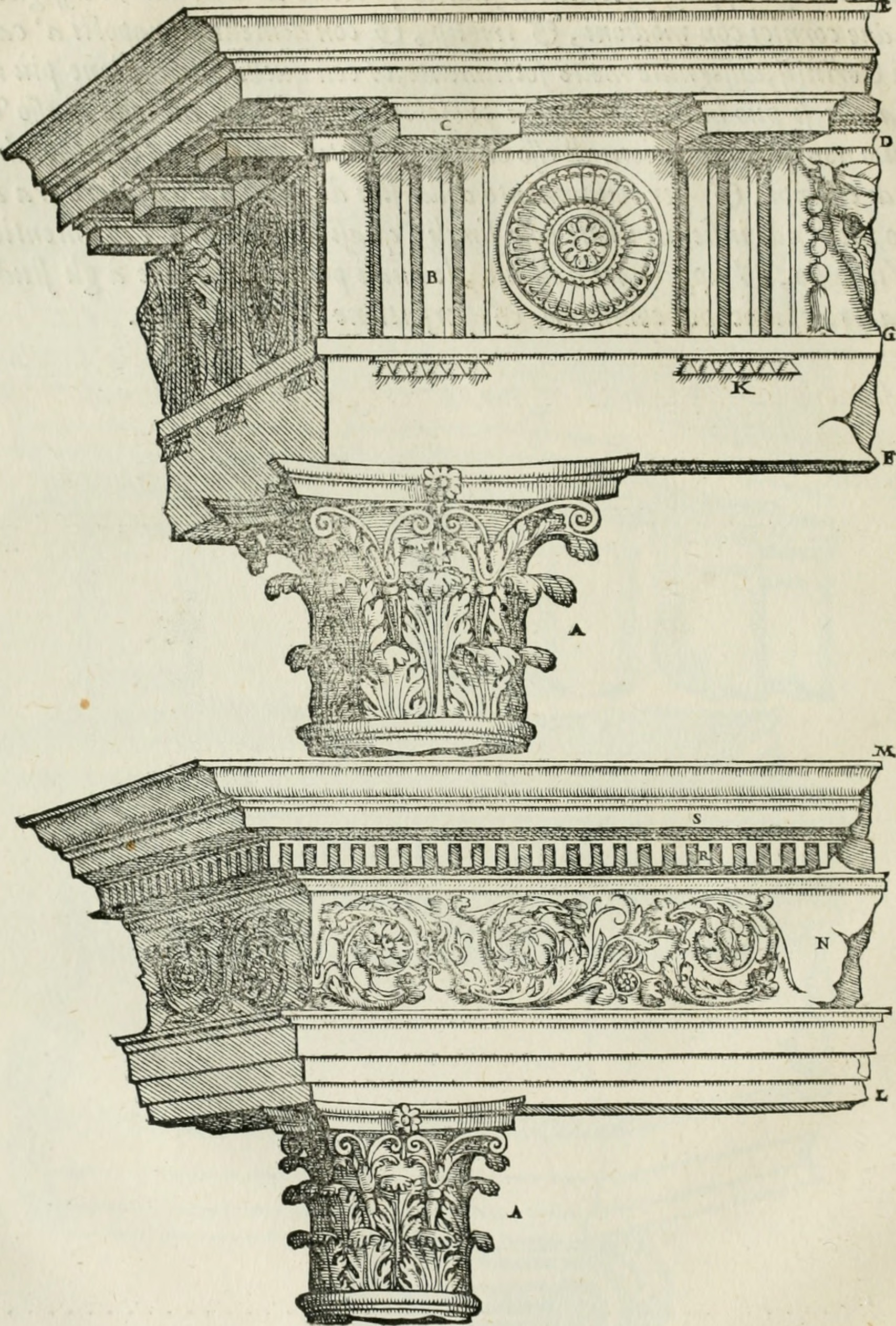
Della Architettvra. Illustration.

Apart from being introduced into building and painting young Antonio Rusconi studied mathematics at the University of Padua under Giovanni Battista Memmo and Niccolò Tartaglia. Extensively consulting Vitruvius’ "Ten Books on Architecture" while he was constructing a novel type of watermill Antonio became aware of many grave technical errors within the work's early Renaissance editions and commentaries. Finally Pietro Lauro, who had rendered Leon Battista Alberti's “De Architectura” into the vernacular, convinced Rusconi to set out with a translation of his own. The text was finished until 1552 and illustrated with more than three hundred supplementary woodcuts. Earlier, Rusconi had already provided the illustrations for Lodovico Dolce's version of the Ovidian “Metamorphoses”. Yet, since then countless treatises on architecture and commentaries on Vitruvius (e.g. by Daniele Barbaro, Gicaomo Vignola and Andrea Palladio) were being published, Rusconi's Venetian editors, Giolito and Tommaso Porcacchi, saw no benefit in printing another title on the subject. Together with Palladio Rusconi draughted the "Palazzo municipale" (Brescia) in 1562, they also took part in rebuilding the Doge's Palace after the fire of 1577 and constructing the Palazzo Grimani. Nevertheless, throughout his life Rusconi's main occupation was that of a hydraulic engineer for the Republic of Venice. After having fallen gravely ill in 1575 Giovan Antonio died in 1579.

== Rusconi's "Della Architettura" ==
Rusconi's “Vitruvius” was only printed after his death in 1590 by the son of his former editor Giolito. Although the latter recognised the value of Giovan Antonio's xylographies he considered his translation and annotations as outdated, and thus a strange “Vitruvius without Vitruvius“ was published: Just about 160 of originally 300 woodcuts were compiled with extracts from Fra Giocondo's and Cesariano's translations of Vitruvius’ treatise. For many of Rusconi's illustrations containing references to textual explanations, it is particularly regrettable that his translation has hence been lost.

== Editions ==
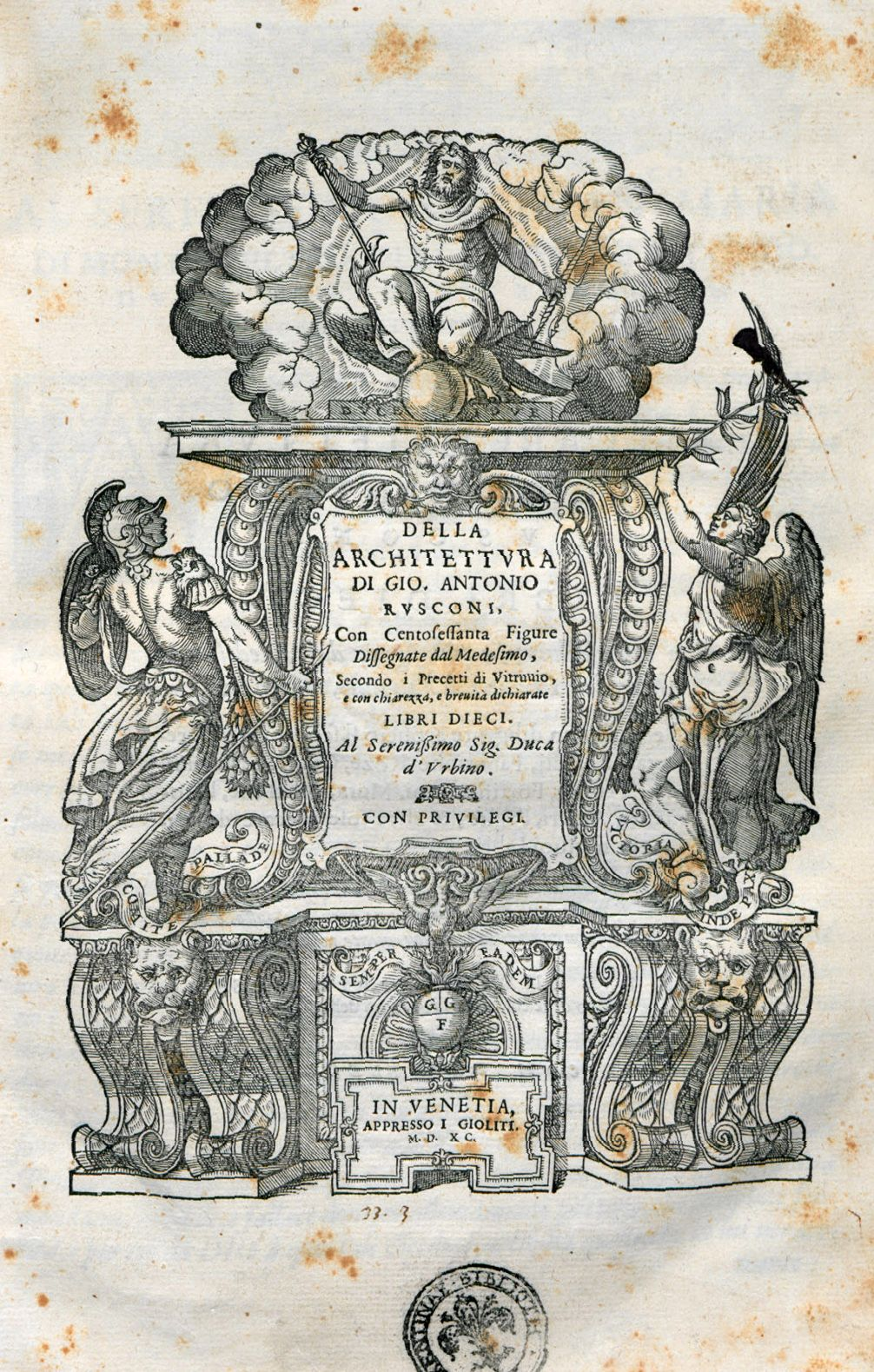
Della architettura, 1590

- Della architettura di Gio. Antonio Rusconi libri dieci edition of 1590 (digitalised by the Bavarian State Library)
- Della Architettura di Gio[van] Antonio Rusconi, Centro Internazionale di Studi di Architettura Andrea Palladio di Vicenza, with reprint of the 1590 edition, Testi e fonti per la storia dell’architettura, Verona and Vicenza 1996.

Treatises on line: http://architectura.cesr.univ-tours.fr/Traite/Auteur/Rusconi.asp?param=en
