= Portrait of Daniele Barbaro =

Painting by Paolo Veronese

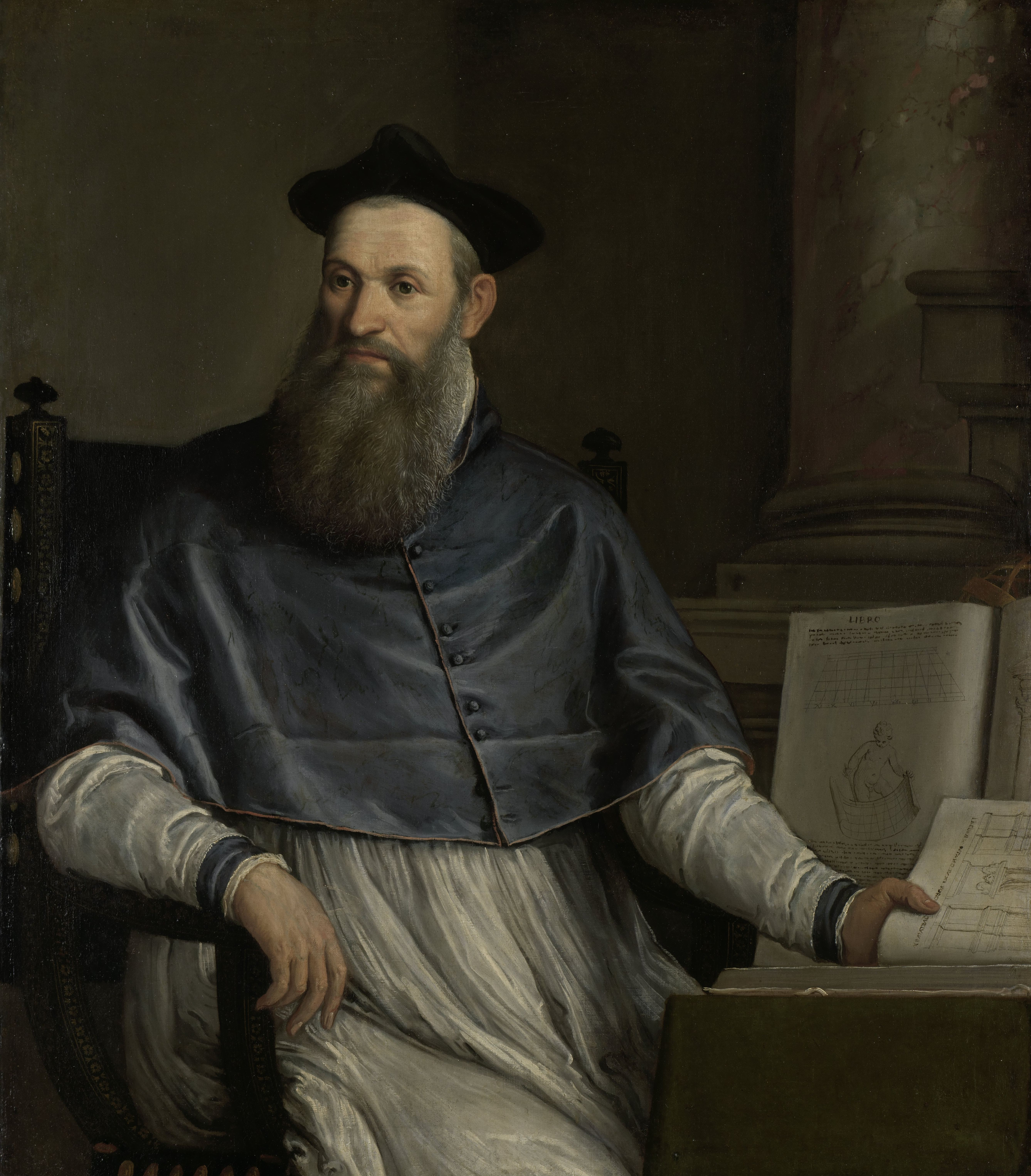
- Artist: Paolo Veronese
- Year: c. 1556–1567
- Medium: Oil on canvas
- Dimensions: 121 cm × 105.5 cm (48 in × 41.5 in)
- Location: Rijksmuseum; Amsterdam

The Portrait of Daniele Barbaro is an oil on canvas painting by the Italian Renaissance master Paolo Veronese, from c. 1556-1557. It is held in the Rijksmuseum, in Amsterdam. Daniele Barbaro was a member of the Venetian aristocracy (see Barbaro family). He was an important prelate, humanist and architectural theorist, who commissioned a number of works from Veronese. Veronese had been involved directly with Barbaro and his brother Marcantonio Barbaro, decorating the Villa Barbaro, Maser, which Palladio designed.

Barbaro, who was Patriarch of Aquileia, is dressed as a bishop. From 1561 he was also a cardinal; although this appointment was in pectore (not made public) he is sitting in the audience posture (reserved normally for Popes and cardinals).

The book standing up is the La Practica della Perspettiva, Barbaro's treatise on artistic perspective. The other volume on the table is Barbaro's "Commentary" on Vitruvius' De architectura, which has illustrations by Andrea Palladio. Barbaro's Commentary on Vitruvius was published in Italian in 1556, but the portrait may be linked to the publication of a second edition in Latin in the 1560s.

== Related works ==
=== Two portraits reunited ===
Barbaro was also portrayed by Titian around 1545 in two versions in the Museo del Prado and the National Gallery of Canada. To commemorate the 500th anniversary of his birth, two portraits of Daniel Barbaro were brought together for a Venice exhibition in 2015, the painting by Titian from the Museo del Prado, and this painting from the Rijksmuseum.

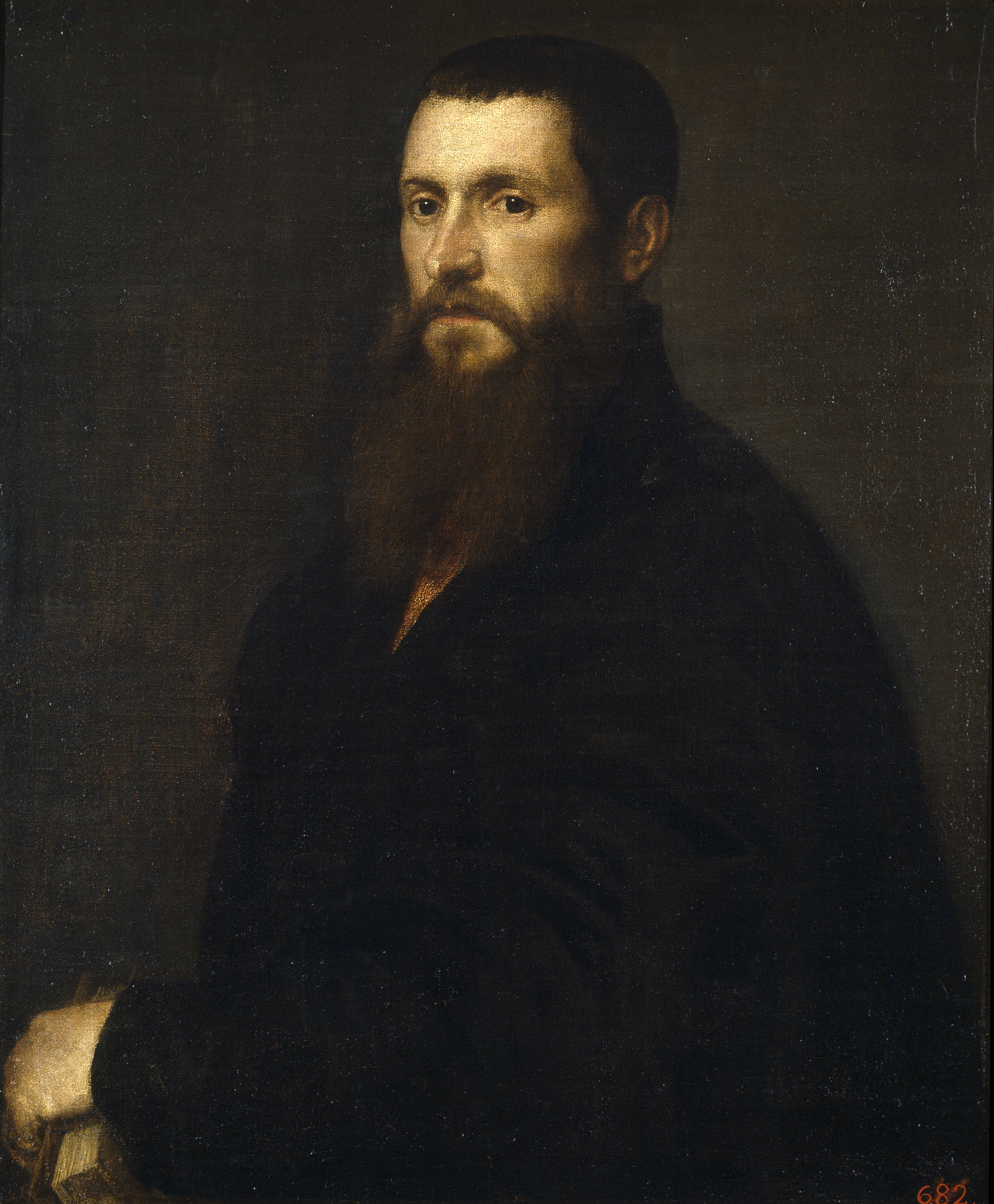
Portrait by Titian

=== Portrait in the Pitti Palace ===
There is a portrait by Veronese in the Pitti Palace, Florence, which has been described as Barbaro dressed as a Venetian aristocrat, but this identification is not certain.

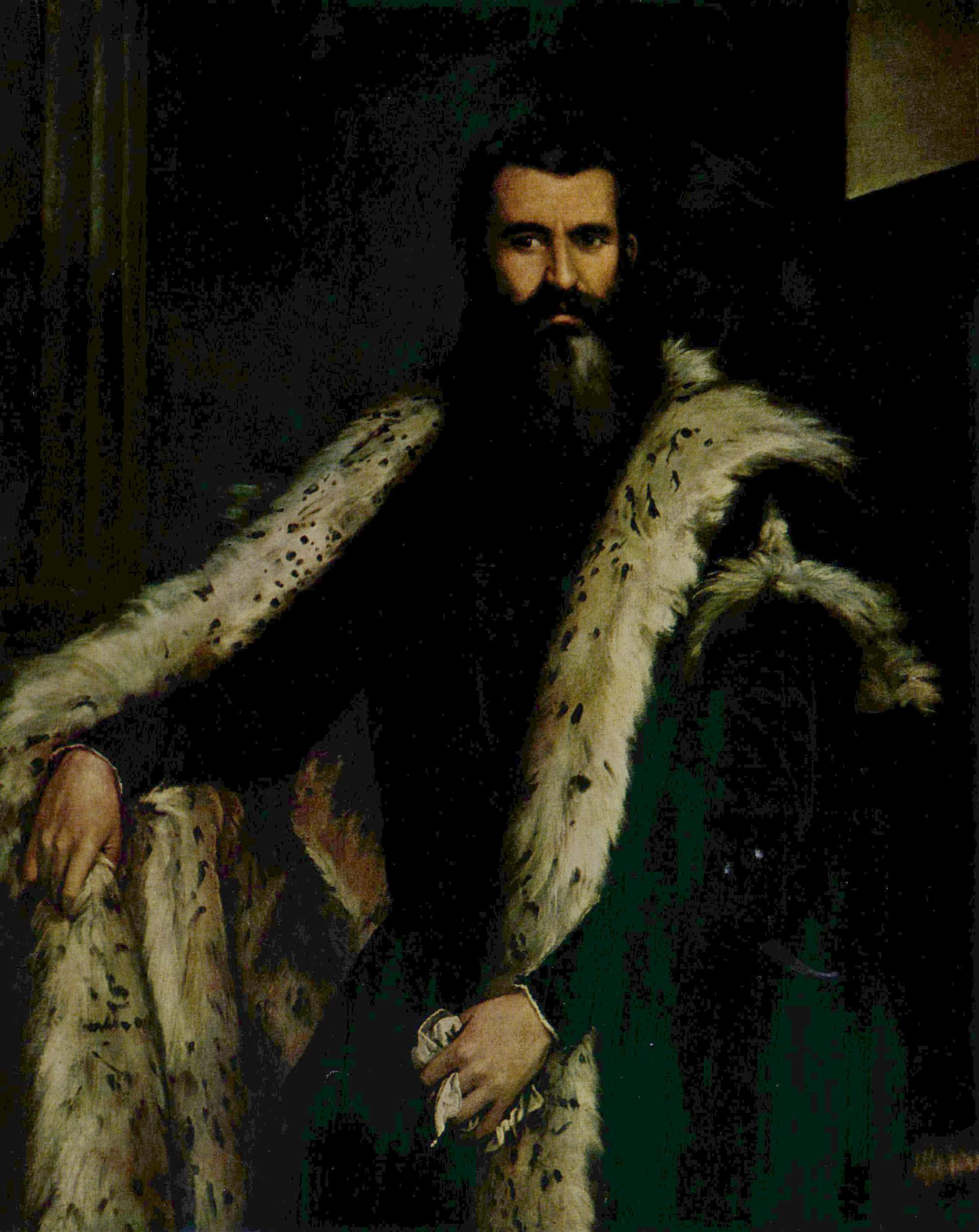
Portrait of a gentleman in a fur by Veronese, previously identified as Daniele Barbaro
