= Portrait of a Gentleman in a Fur =

Painting by Paolo Veronese

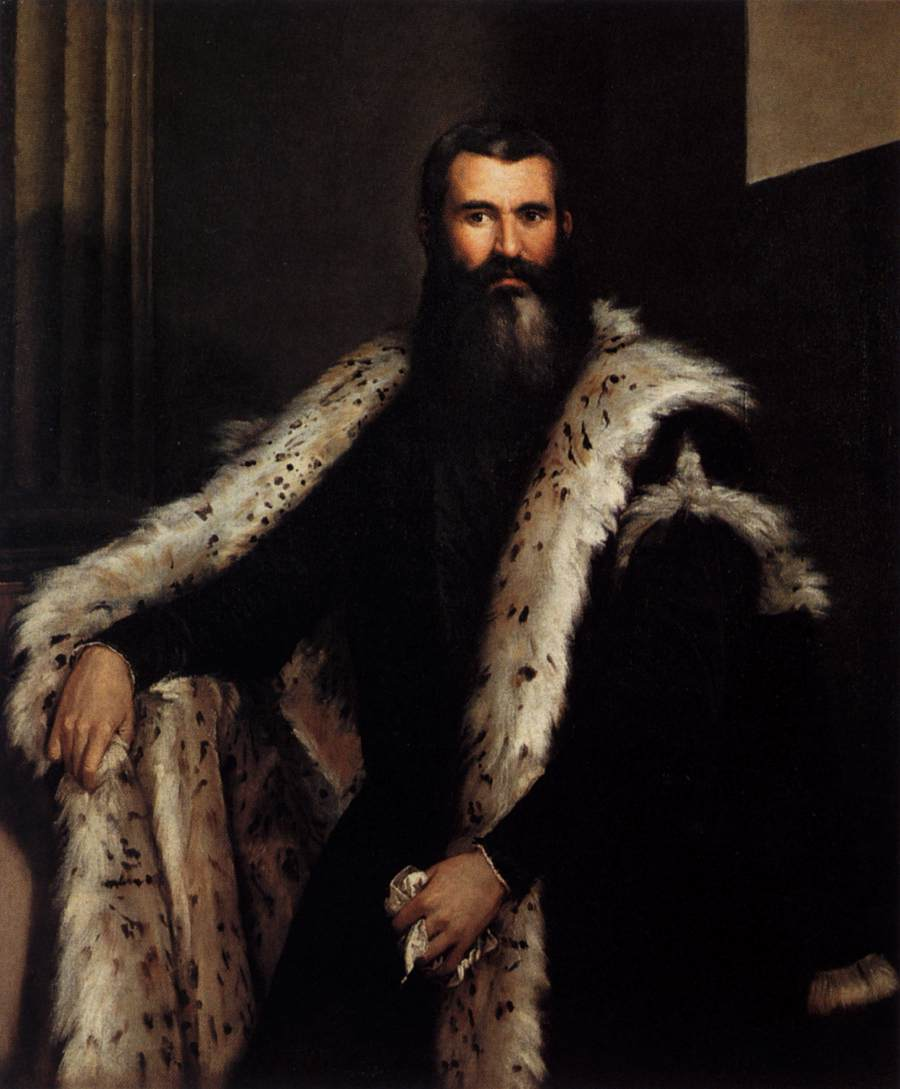
- Artist: Paolo Veronese
- Year: c. 1550–1560
- Medium: Oil on canvas
- Dimensions: 140 cm × 107 cm (55 in × 42 in)
- Location: Galleria Palatina; Florence

The Portrait of a Gentleman in a Fur (Italian: Ritratto di gentiluomo in pelliccia) is an oil painting by the Italian Renaissance painter Paolo Veronese measuring 140 centimetres (55 in) by 107 centimetres (42 in), dated to c. 1550–1560 and now in the Galleria Palatina in Florence. Another version exists at the Museum of Fine Arts in Budapest. The painting's subject is unknown: Daniele Barbaro has been suggested, but this is contradicted by a confirmed portrait of him held at the Rijksmuseum in Amsterdam.

== Description ==
A shadowy room hinted at by a wall, fluted pillar, and window forms the backdrop to the knee-length portrait of a man richly dressed in a black cloak lined with ermine fur. He looks intently towards the viewer. He has a long beard and short, greying hair. He holds a white handkerchief in his left hand and grasps the ermine lining of the cloak with his right.

The influence of Titian is evident, though Veronese managed to express his own style in the search for the individuality of the subject and, above all, through the technical mastery evident in the detailed and realistic rendering of the fur.

== Provenance ==
The painting's exact date of completion is unknown, varying from 1549 to 1570 at the broadest extremes. It portrays an unidentified character. Suggestions the figure is Daniele Barbaro seem unlikely when compared to a confirmed portrait of him at the Rijksmuseum.

At some point Cardinal Leopoldo de' Medici purchased the painting through an agent.

Another version dated to c. 1555 and measuring 120 centimetres (47 in) by 102 centimetres (40 in) exists at the Museum of Fine Arts in Budapest. A certain T. Vercruyse or T. Ver. Cruyse dal Paradis also made engraved copies of the painting.
