= Vincenzo Valgrisi =

French-born printer (c. 1490 – after 1572)

- Born: Vincent Vaugris c. 1490; Charly
- Died: after 1572
- Occupations: Publisher; printer
- Years active: 1540–1572

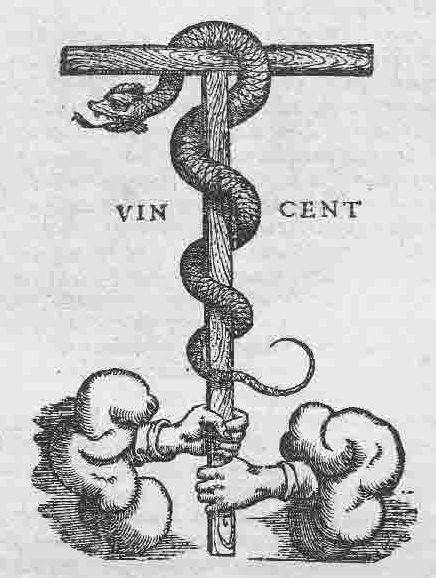
Valgrisi's printer's mark. It is composed of a tau cross around which a snake coils and supported by two hands and labelled with his name, Vincent.

Vincenzo Valgrisi (c. 1490 – after 1572) was a French-born printer active primarily in Venice in the 16th century. Alternatively, he was known under his Latinized name as Vicentius Valgrisius.

== Early life ==
Valgrisi was born in Charly near Lyon around 1490.

== Career ==
During his career, he published approximately 200 works. Most of his work was published in Venice, with a brief period being published in Rome from 1549 to 1551. Valgrisi was in Venice well before 1532.

An act of sale dated December 16, 1532 documents that Valgrisi, along with his father-in-law acquired a bookshop at the sign of The Head of Erasmus where he attests to having lived in Venice for many years. Many of the books published out of this bookshop bear the imprint "Ex Officina Erasmiana".

In 1570, the Roman Inquisition fined him 50 ducats (about 6oz of gold) for selling prohibited books. His storehouse was found to contain 1,150 volumes of prohibited works, including 400 copies of Simolachri, historie e figure de la morte, Valgrisi's imitation of Hans Holbein's Dance of Death.

His edition of Orlando Furioso by Ariosto is noted for two innovations: the start of every canto was preceded by a full page illustration (not a small vignette as was common in his time), and the text was accompanied by maps that followed the movements of the characters.

Vincenzo Valgrisi's printer's marks

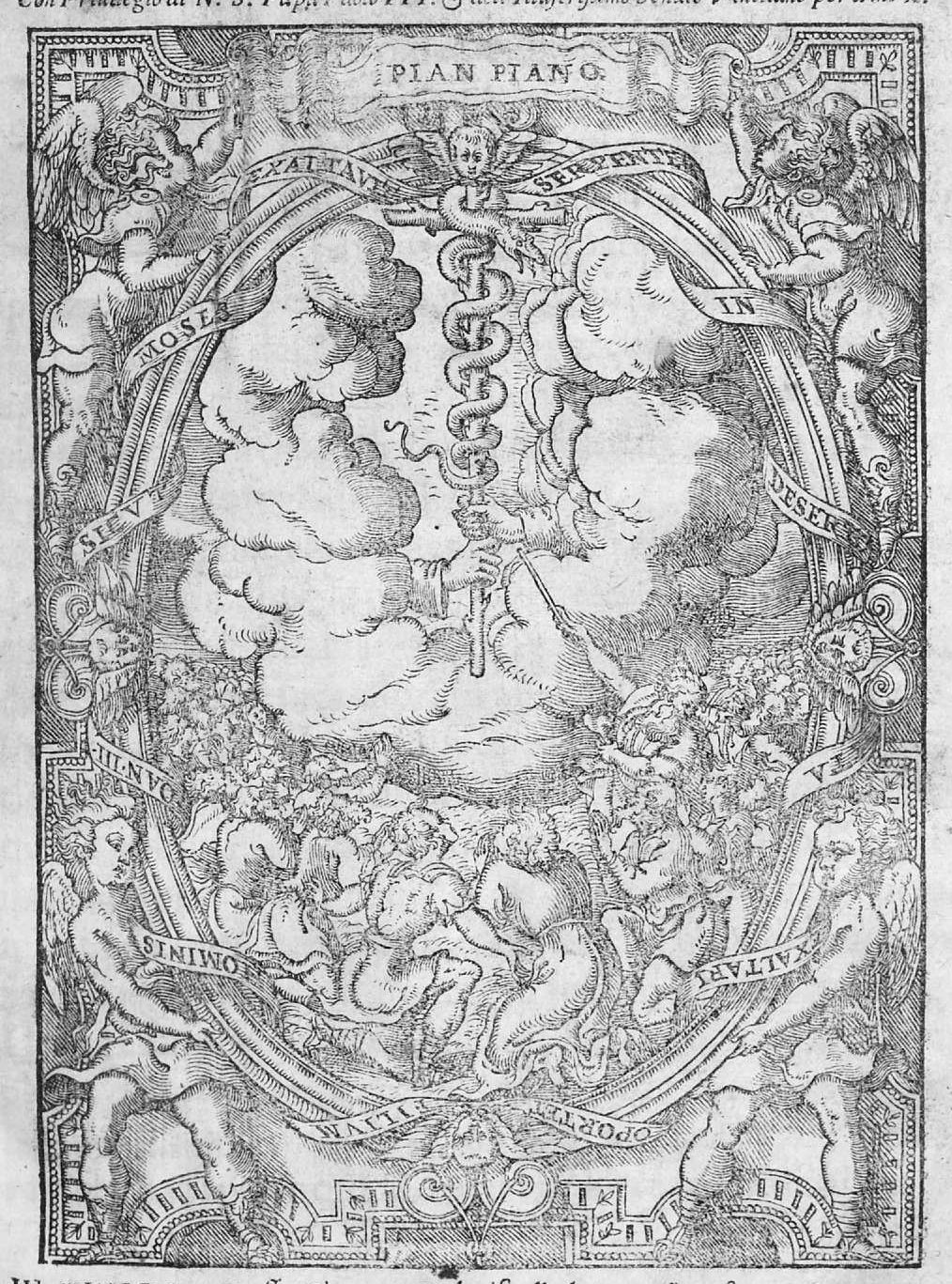

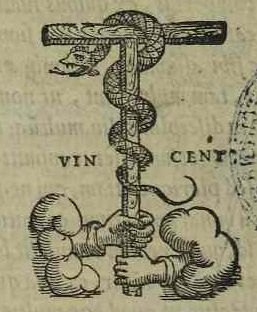

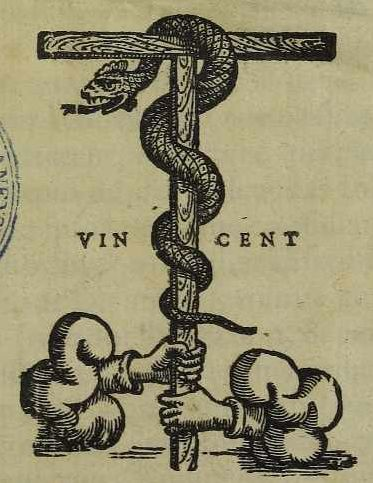

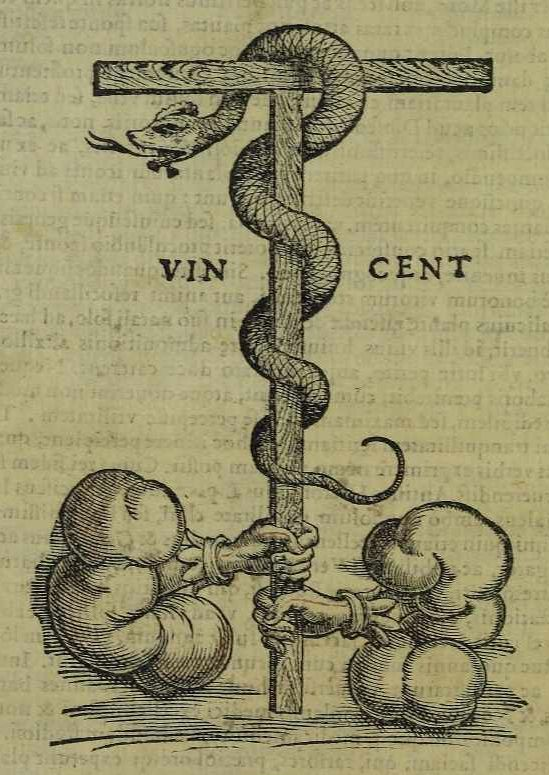

== Bibliography ==
- Ilaria Andreoli (2006), Ex officina erasmiana. Vincenzo Valgrisi e l'illustrazione del libro tra Venezia e Lione alla metà del '500
- Tammaro De Marinis (1937), Enciclopedia Italiana

== See also ==
- Media related to Vincenzo Valgrisi at Wikimedia Commons
