= Pedro de Luján =

Spanish nobleman, captain and conquistador

- Monarch: Charles V

Personal details
- Born: C.1500 Madrid, Spain
- Died: 1536 Luján River, Buenos Aires
- Occupation: Conquistador
- Profession: Army's officer

Military service
- Allegiance: Spain
- Branch/service: Spanish Navy
- Years of service: 1520s-1536
- Rank: Captain
- Battles/wars: Combate de Corpus Christi

Pedro de Luján (1500s-1536) was a Spanish nobleman, captain and conquistador of the Río de la Plata. He had arrived in Buenos Aires in the expedition of his uncle, Pedro de Mendoza.

== Biography ==
Luján was born in Spain, son of Pedro de Luján and Mencia de Lago, belonging to a noble family. He was possibly a descendant of Pedro de Luján, a vassal of John II of Castile and Ines de Bracamonte, the granddaughter of Robert de Bracquemont.

He died June 15, 1536, during the Battle of Corpus Christi, where the invading Spanish forces clashed with natives. In the combat Pedro Luján, who served as captain of the troop, was wounded, dying in question of hours on the riverbank. The area was named Luján in his honour.
