= Niccolò Franco (pamphleteer) =

16th-century Italian poet and writer

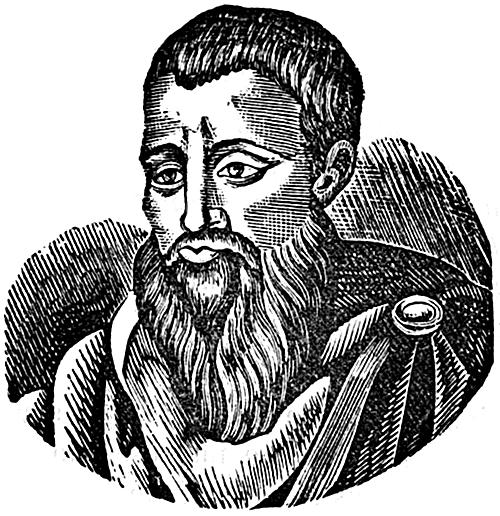
- Born: 13 or 14 September 1515; Benevento, Italy
- Died: 11 March 1570, aged 55; Rome, Italy
- Cause of death: Execution by hanging

Academic work
- Main interests: Poetry, eulogies, invectives, licentious sonnets and literary products

Niccolò Franco (13/14 September 1515 – 11 March 1570) was an Italian poet and literato who was executed for libel in the 16th century.

== Life ==
Born in Benevento to a modest family, Franco completed humanistic studies at the school of his brother Vincenzo. In his youth he made friends with his compatriot Antonio Delli Sorici. In 1544 Franco moved to Naples, where he undertook legal studies, coming into contact with the jurist Bartolomeo Camerario. In Naples he wrote a hundred Latin epigrams in honor of Isabella di Capua, wife of Ferrante I Gonzaga.

In 1536 he moved to Venice as a guest of Benedetto Agnelli, speaker of the Duke of Mantua. In August of the same year he published the poem Il tempio di Amore in octaves. Carlo Simiani showed that Il Tempio di Amore was actually plagiarised by Franco from the Neapolitan Iacopo Campanile, known as ‘Capanio’.

The following year Franco entered the service of the famous writer and poet Pietro Aretino. Given his predisposition to letters, no less than to invective, Franco soon became the secretary of Aretino and, after a few years, he decided to go freelance, offering his services to well-known personages of the day. Aretino was averse to this initiative and after some verbal or written exchanges, the dispute ended with Franco receiving a dagger blow to his face from Ambrogio Eusebi, the friend of Aretino, which left him scarred and resulted in his decision to move to another city. He travelled the Italian peninsula offering his services to various gentlemen and lords, including in Casale Monferrato, Mantua, Cosenza, and Naples, before settling in Rome in 1558.

While in Rome he intended to begin a career as a writer and libelist, putting his pen at the disposal of various powerful citizens, who would hire him to produce eulogies, invectives, licentious sonnets and any other literary product requested at the time, including some pasquinade, but shortly after his arrival, on 15 July 1558, he was arrested in the home of Bartolomeo Camerario, then praefectus annonae, who was also arrested for embezzlement. Franco remained in prison for eight months. He regained his freedom on February 6, 1559 thanks to the intervention of Giovanni Carafa, Duke of Paliano; with his freedom the seized papers were returned to him. He gained familiarity within the social circle of Cardinal Giovanni Morone.

His great misfortune was to accept a commission from the Apostolic Tax Prosecutor Alessandro Pallantieri to produce an infamous pamphlet and some pasquinades addressed to Pope Paul IV (Pietro Carafa), for distribution following his death (Commento sopra la vita et costumi di Giovan Pietro Carafa che fu Paolo IV chiamato, et sopra le qualità de tutti i suoi et di coloro che con lui governaro il pontificato). In 1557 Pallantieri had been investigated for tax offenses and imprisoned. Cardinal Carlo Carafa, having dismissed him, was considered his enemy. Following the death of Paul IV, Pope Pius IV (Giovanni Medici) was elected to release Pallantieri and appoint him Governor of Rome and to send to death, after a summary trial, two important members of the Carafa family. Everything seemed to be going well, when in 1566 the sudden death of Pius IV and the electoral alliance between cardinals Charles Borromeo and Alessandro Farnese, worried by the enormous power of Pallantieri, caused the unexpected election of Antonio Ghislieri, pupil of the family Carafa, with the name of Pius V. As soon as he arrived on the papal throne, Pius V ordered the revision of the "Carafa trial", dismissed Pallantieri from Rome and began an investigation into the actions of the former governor. It is in the context of this clash between the powerful that the writer was overwhelmed by events. The house of Niccolò Franco was searched, all the papers were seized and he was imprisoned (1 September 1568). Questioned and tortured, Franco confessed to Pallantieri's commission for the creation of the libels against Paul IV and his family, entitled Commento sopra la vita et costumi di Gio. Pietro Carafa che fu Paolo IV chiamato et sopra le qualità de tutti i suoi et di coloro che con lui governaro in pontificato. Probably to preempt a retraction, which would have prevented Pallantieri's indictment, and despite Cardinal Morone's defense of the writer at trial, Franco was sentenced to death and hanged on 11 March 1570 at the Ponte Sant'Angelo in Rome, in accordance with that recent law which, ironically, Pallantieri had strongly wanted and promulgated as governor of Rome.

A road in the Italian city of Benevento is dedicated to Franco.

== Works ==
- Pistole vulgari (1539)
- Petrarchista (1539); a satire on the imitators of the style of Petrarch
- Dialoghi piacevolissimi (1539); in homage to Torquato Tasso
- Rime contro Pietro Aretino (1545)
- Priapea (1546); probably inspired by the 1534 publication of a collection of Diversorum Veterum poetarum in Priapum lusus together with the virgilian Appendix and the pseudo-virgilian Priapea.
- Il Duello (1546)
- La Philena (1547); romance
- Rime maritime (1547)
- Dialogi piacevoli (1554)
- Dix Plaisans dialogues (1579); transl., from Italian into French by Gabriel Chappuys.
- Dialoghi piacevolissimi di Nicolo Franco da Benevento. Espurgati da Girolamo Gioannini da Capugnano… (1590, 1599, 1609)
- De le Lettere di Nicolò Franco, scritte a prencipi, signori, et ad altri personaggi e suoi amici, libri tre, ne le quali si scuopre l'arte del polito e del terso scrivere. Di nuovo ristampate et à candida lezione ridotte [da Giovanni Bruno] (1604, 1615)
- Li Due Petrarchisti, dialoghi di Nicolò Franco e di Ercole Giovannini, ne' quali... si scuoprono... secretti soprà il Petrarca e si danno a leggere molte lettere missive... que lo stesso Petrarca... scrisse al re Roberto di Napoli... (1623)
- Li due Petrarchisti. Dialoghi di Nicolò Franco e di Ercole Giovannini... (1625)
- Baldi, Rota, Franco, del Vasto, Fidentio, marittimi e pedanteschi del secolo XVI. [Published by Andrea Rubbi.] (1787)
- La Priapea, sonetti lussuriosisatirici (1790)
- Dialogi piacevoli (2003)
- Dialogo del venditore di libri (2005)
