= St Raphael's Church =

St Raphael's Church may refer to:

== Canada ==
- St. Raphael the Archangel Church (Montreal)

== Colombia ==
- St Raphael's Church, San Rafael

== Italy ==
- San Raffaele, Naples
- Angelo San Raffaele, Venice

== United Kingdom ==
- St Raphael's Church, Surbiton

== United States ==
=== Hawaii ===
- Saint Raphael Catholic Church (Koloa, Hawaii)

=== New York ===
- Church of Sts. Cyril & Methodius and St. Raphael in Manhattan, originally named Church of St. Raphael

=== North Carolina ===
- St. Raphael the Archangel Catholic Church (Raleigh, North Carolina)

=== Ohio ===
- St. Raphael's Catholic Church (Springfield, Ohio)

== See also ==
- St. Raphael's Cathedral (disambiguation)
