= Morlaiter =

Morlaiter may refer to:

- Giovanni Maria Morlaiter (1699-1781), Italian sculptor
- Michelangelo Morlaiter (1729-1806), Italian painter
