= San Bartolomeo, Venice =

Church in Venice, Italy

San Bartolomeo
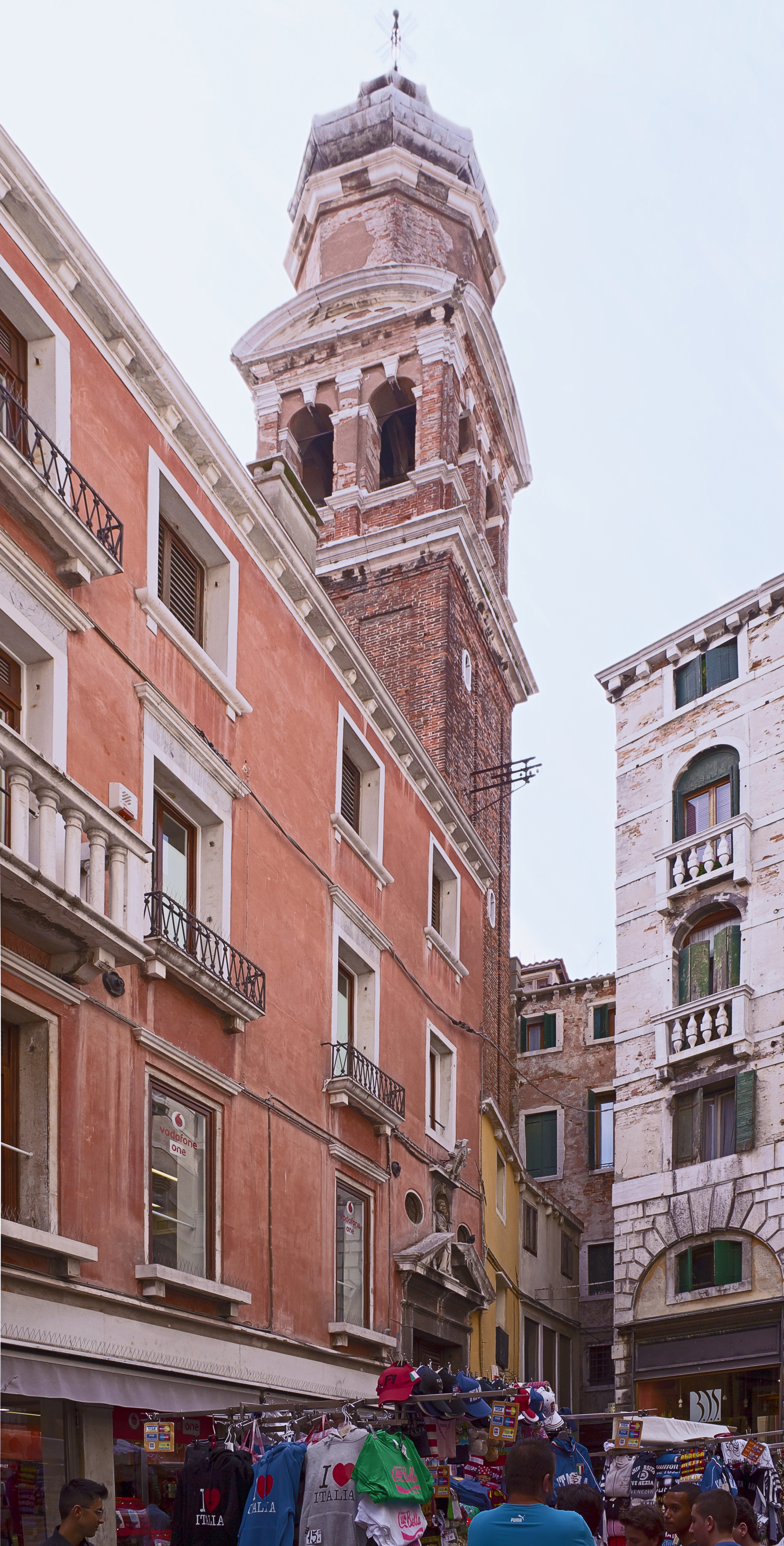
- The entrance and the bell-tower of San Bartolomeo

- Location within Venice

Religion
- Affiliation: Roman Catholic
- Status: Active

Location
- Municipality: Venice
- Country: Italy
- Coordinates: 45°26′15″N 12°20′11″E

Architecture
- Type: Church
- Completed: 830

San Bartolomeo (Saint Bartholomew) is a church in Venice, Italy. It is near the Rialto Bridge in the sestiere (district) of San Marco.

== History ==
The church was supposedly founded in 830, and was originally dedicated to Saint Demetrius of Thessaloniki. It was renovated in 1170, and became the church of the German community in Venice, whose commercial headquarters were nearby at the Fondaco dei Tedeschi.

The church was rebuilt again in the 18th century. The bell tower was built in 1747–54 based on designs of Giovanni Scalfarotto.

== Art works ==
The interior has two sculptures by the Venetian sculptor of German origin Enrico Merengo (Heinrich Meyring). On the right is an altarpiece by Lattanzio Querena of the Death of Francesco Saverio (1836). An altarpiece of Saint Michael (1798) is by Pietro Novelli. The sacristy leads to the Scoletta or Scuola Piccola della Nazione Tedesca: the hall of the German community with a series of canvases of the Life of the Virgin. Above the exit to the sacristy is a canvas of the Gathering of Manna by Sante Peranda. The right rear chapel has frescoes by Michelangelo Morlaiter and Sante Peranda. The chancel has a high altar by Meyring with three canvases by Palma the Younger, and a fresco on the ceiling by Michelangelo Morlaiter. On the left upper nave is a Miracle of the bronze serpents, also by Palma the Younger, while the left aisle houses a St Matthew by Leonardo Corona and a Dormition by Pietro Muttoni.

Albrecht Dürer's painting Feast of the Rosary, commissioned for the church, is now in the National Gallery in Prague. Large doors or shutters for an organ (which no longer exists), painted by Sebastiano del Piombo, are now in the Gallerie dell'Accademia in Venice. The open doors show St Louis of Toulouse and St Sébald of Nuremberg; when closed they show St Bartholomew and St Sebastian.

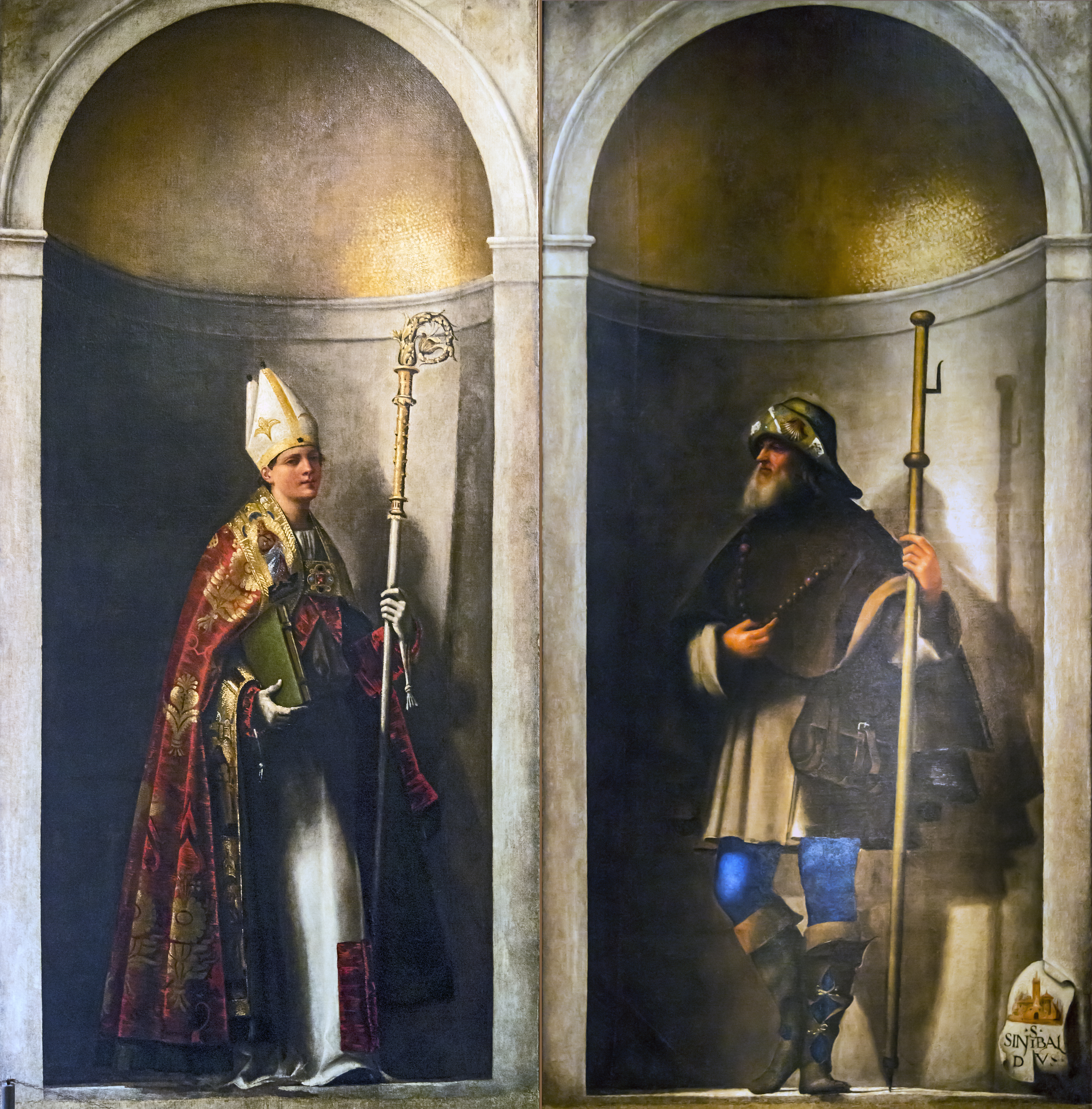
Open doors

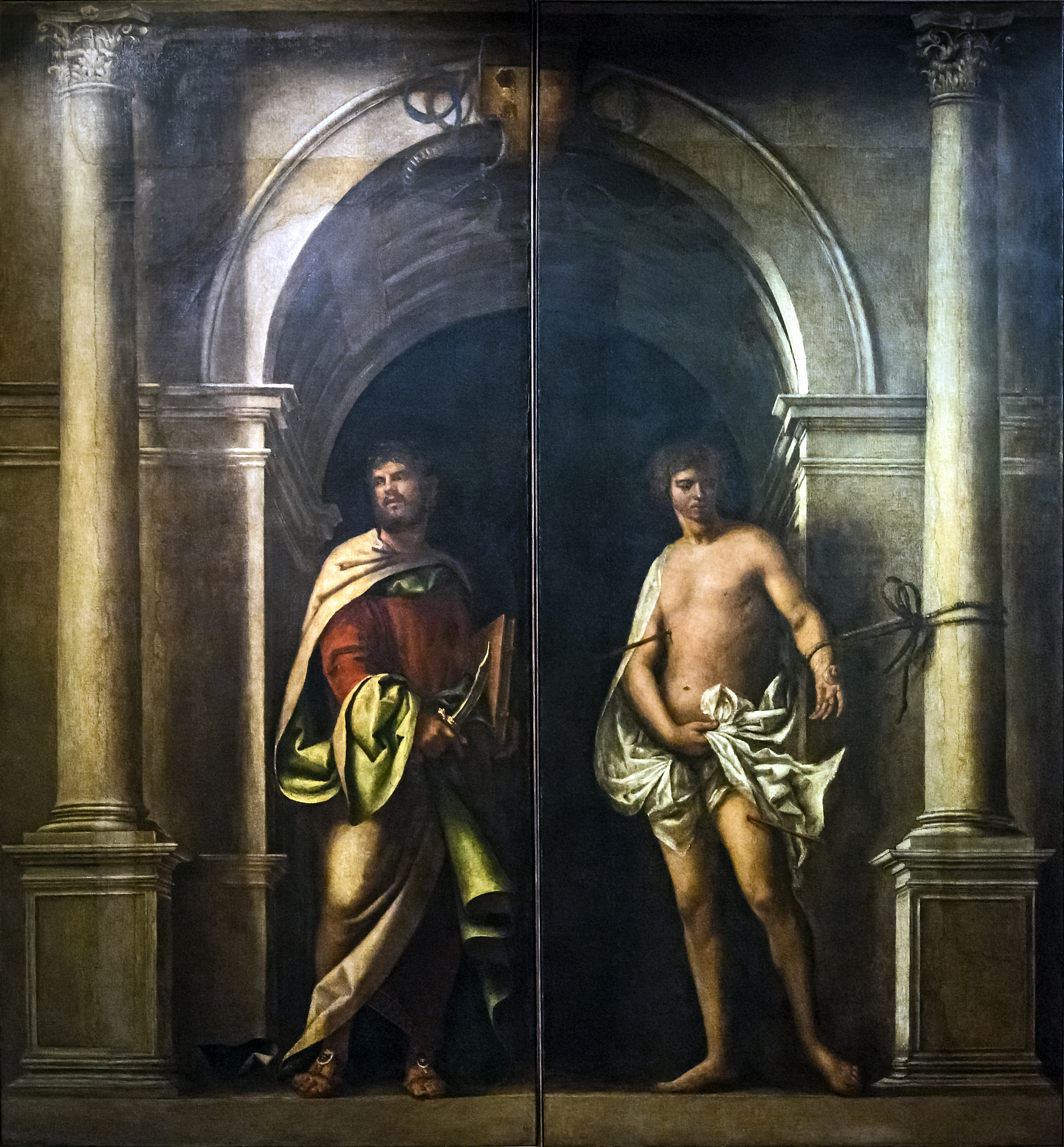
Closed doors
