= San Moisè, Venice =

Roman Catholic church in Venice, Italy

San Moisè
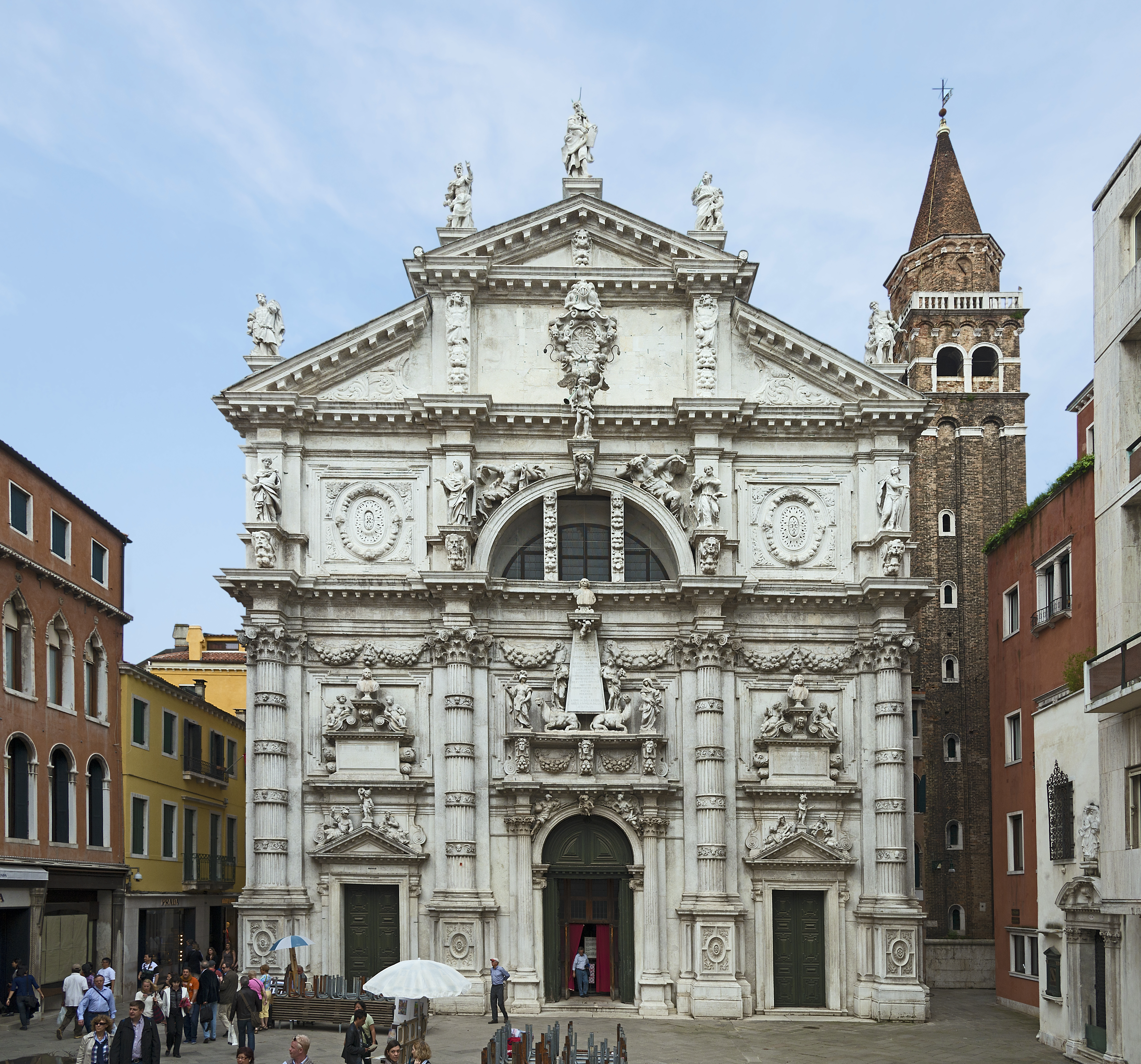
- San Moisè facade

- Location within Venice Location within Italy

Religion
- Affiliation: Roman Catholic
- Province: Venice

Location
- Location: Venice, Italy
- Interactive map of San Moisè
- Coordinates: 45°25′59″N 12°20′10″E

The Chiesa di San Moisè (or San Moisè Profeta) is a Baroque style, Roman Catholic church in Venice, northern Italy.

== History ==
The church was built initially in the 7th century. It is dedicated to Moses since like the Byzantines, the Venetians often considered Old Testament prophets as canonized saints. It also honours Moisè Venier, the aristocrat who funded the reconstruction during the 9th century.

San Moisè is the parish church of one of the parishes in the Vicariate of San Marco-Castello. The other churches within the parish are Santa Maria Zobenigo, San Fantin, Santa Croce degli Armeni and the Basilica of San Marco itself.

== Exterior ==
The elaborate Baroque façade, dating from 1668, is profusely decorated with sculpture. Some of its sculptures are generally attributed to the German artist Heinrich Meyring. The architectural design is attributed to Alessandro Tremignon, with patronage by Vincenzo Fini, whose bust is found over the entry door. Statues in public spaces were forbidden in Venice, thus by putting his bust on the façade of a church, he could circumvent this ordinance and display his wealth and his recent addition to the Libro d'Oro of Venetian aristocracy.

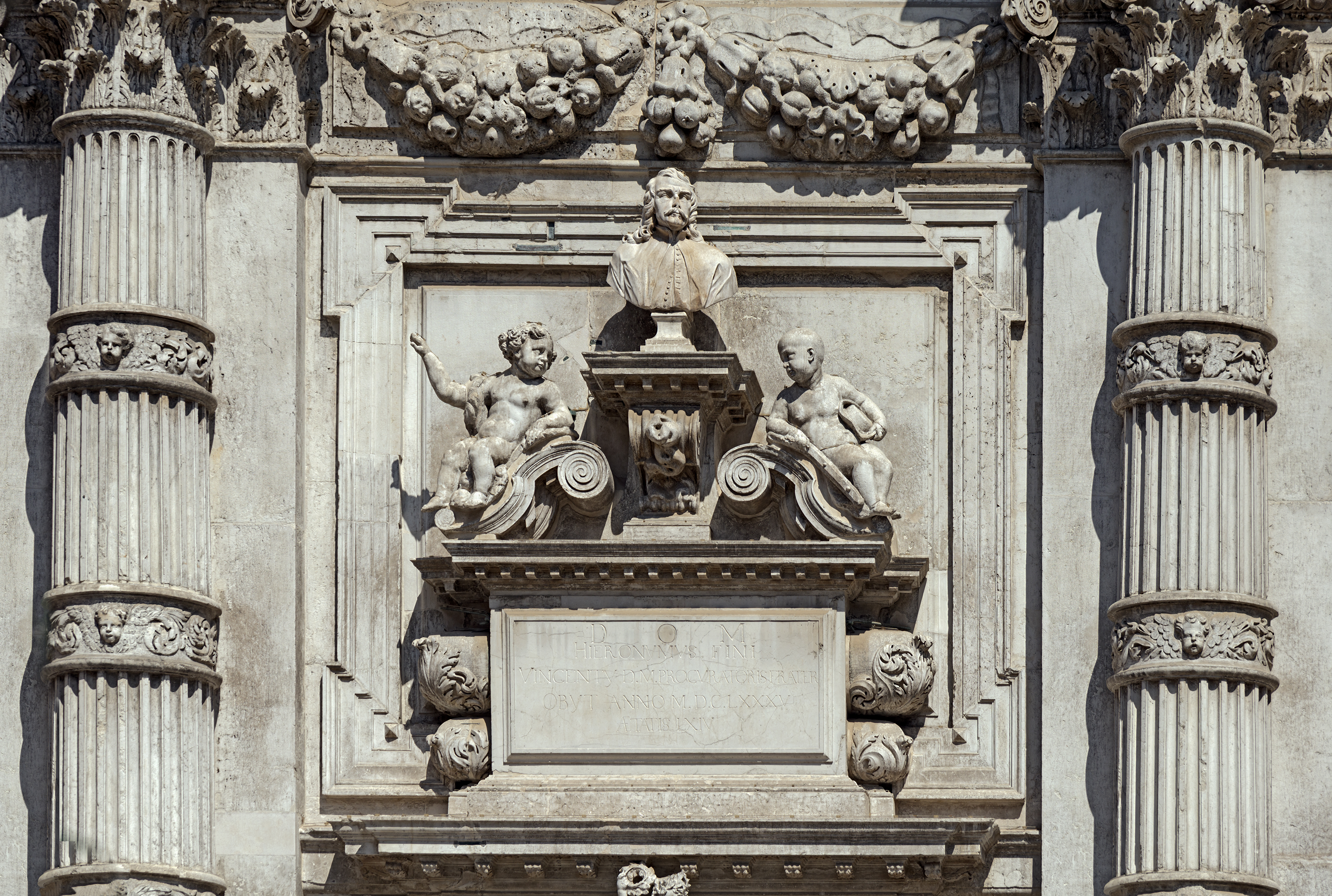
Girolamo Fini's Cenotaph

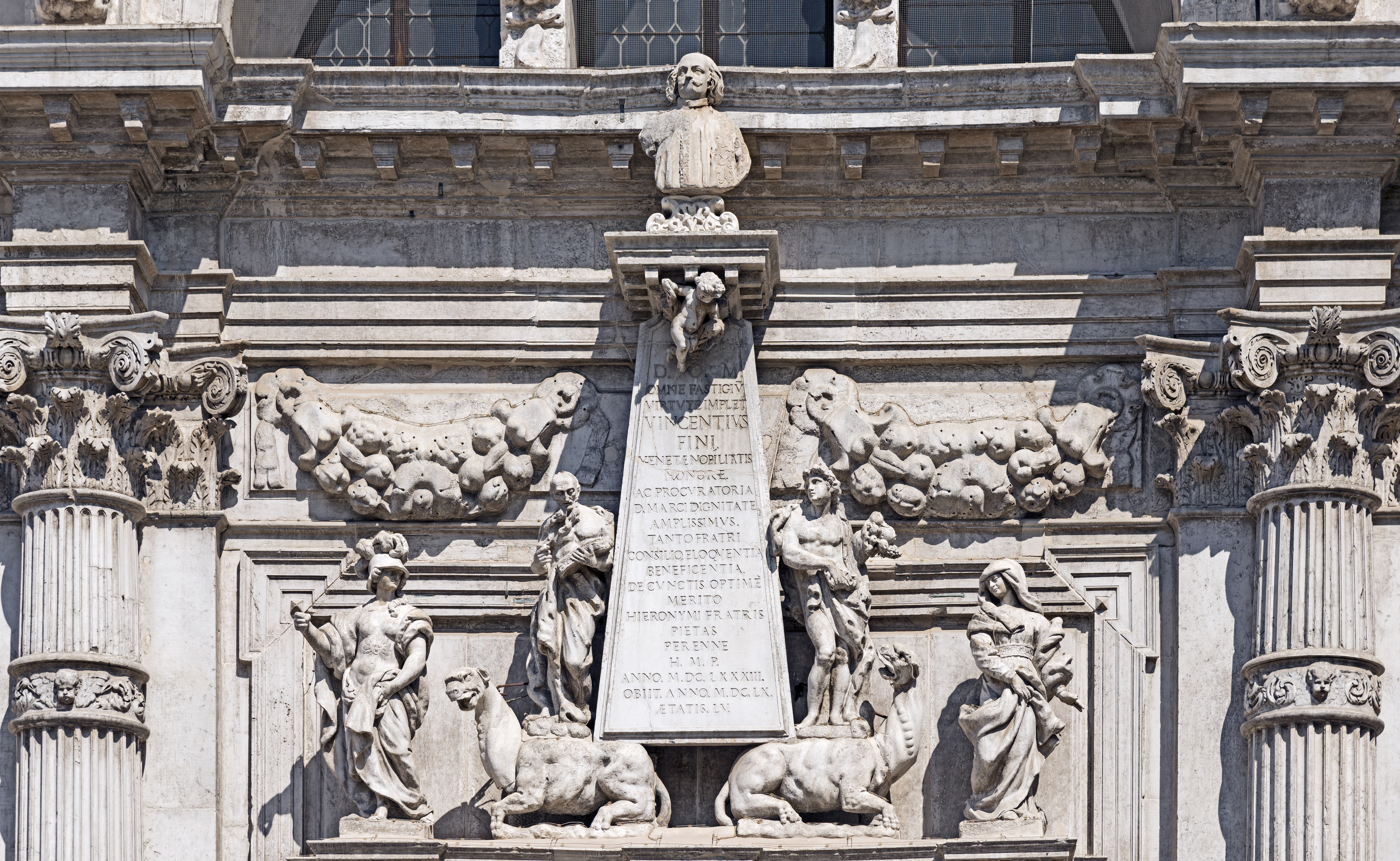
Monument to Vincenzo Fini

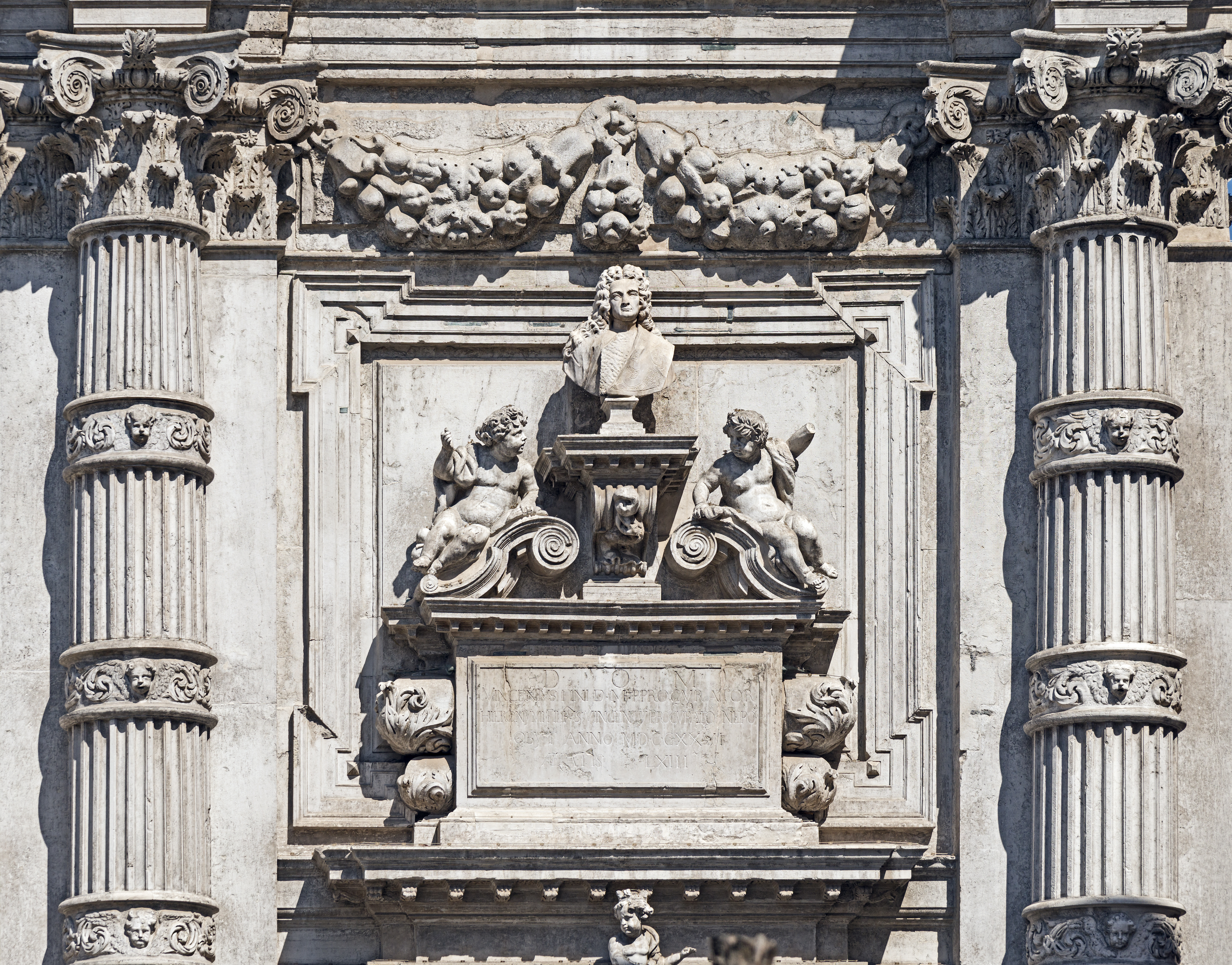
Vincenzo Fini's Cenotaph

== Interior ==
The interior is dominated by Meyring's huge and mannerist sculptural set piece and altarpiece, depicting Moses at Mount Sinai receiving the Tablets, created by Tremignon and Meyring. Behind it is a canvas painted by Michelangelo Morlaiter. It also has a Washing of the Feet by Tintoretto, and a Last Supper by Palma il Giovane. The altarpiece of the Deposition (1636) was painted by Niccolò Roccatagliata in collaboration with Sebastiano.

John Law, originator of the bankrupt Mississippi Scheme, is buried in the church.

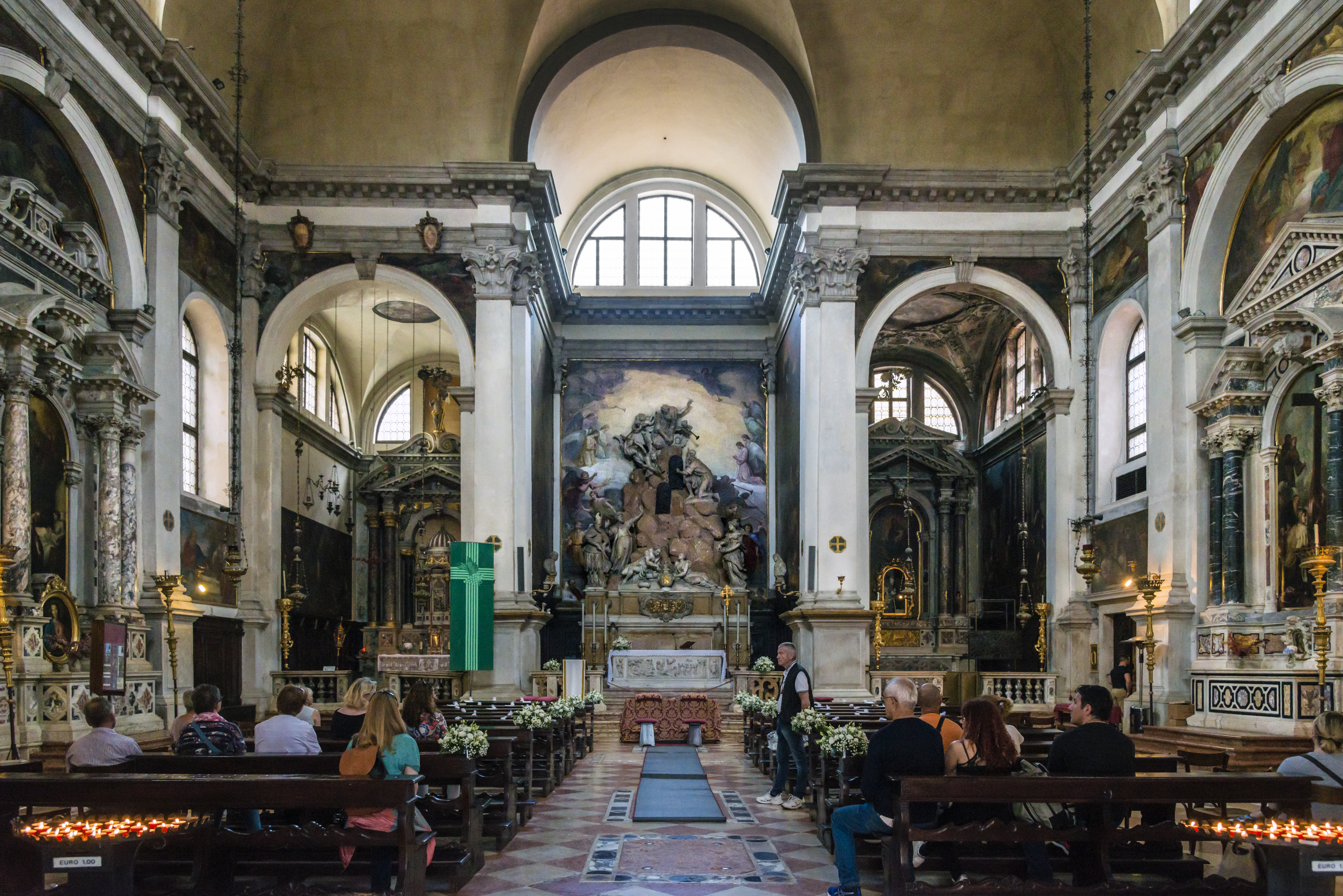
Interior view

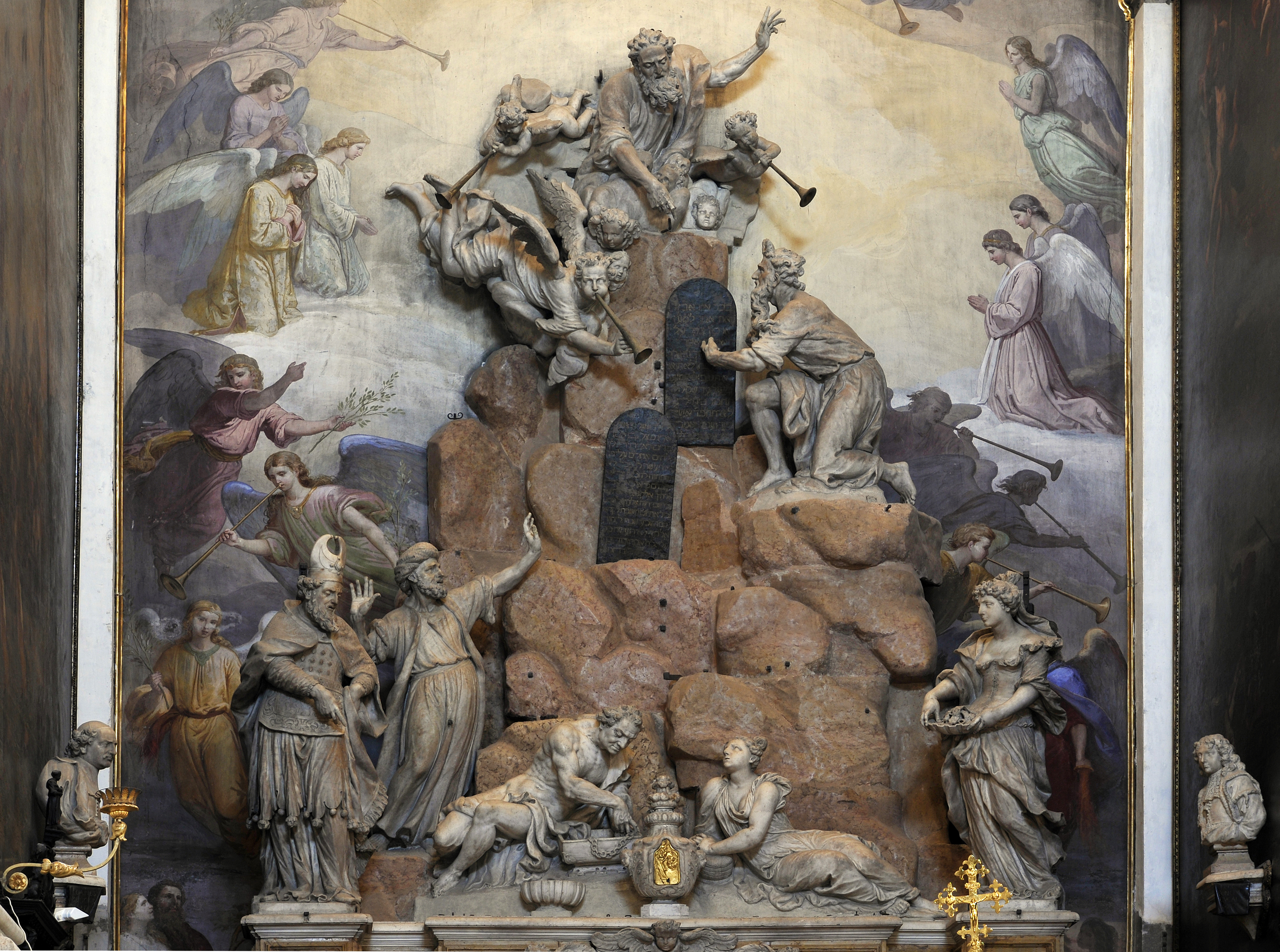
Main Altarpiece with sculpture by Meyring and painting by Morlaiter

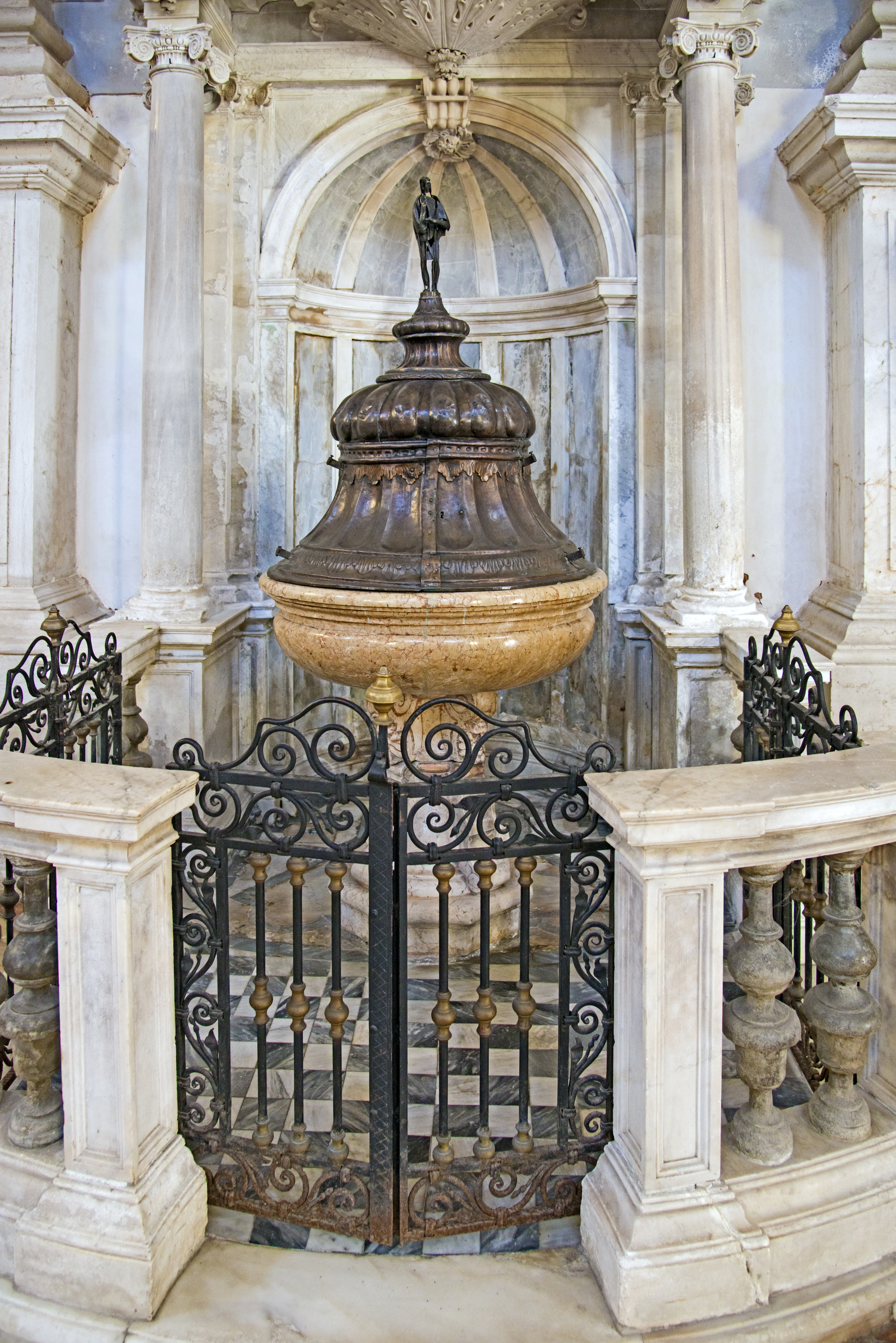
Baptismal font

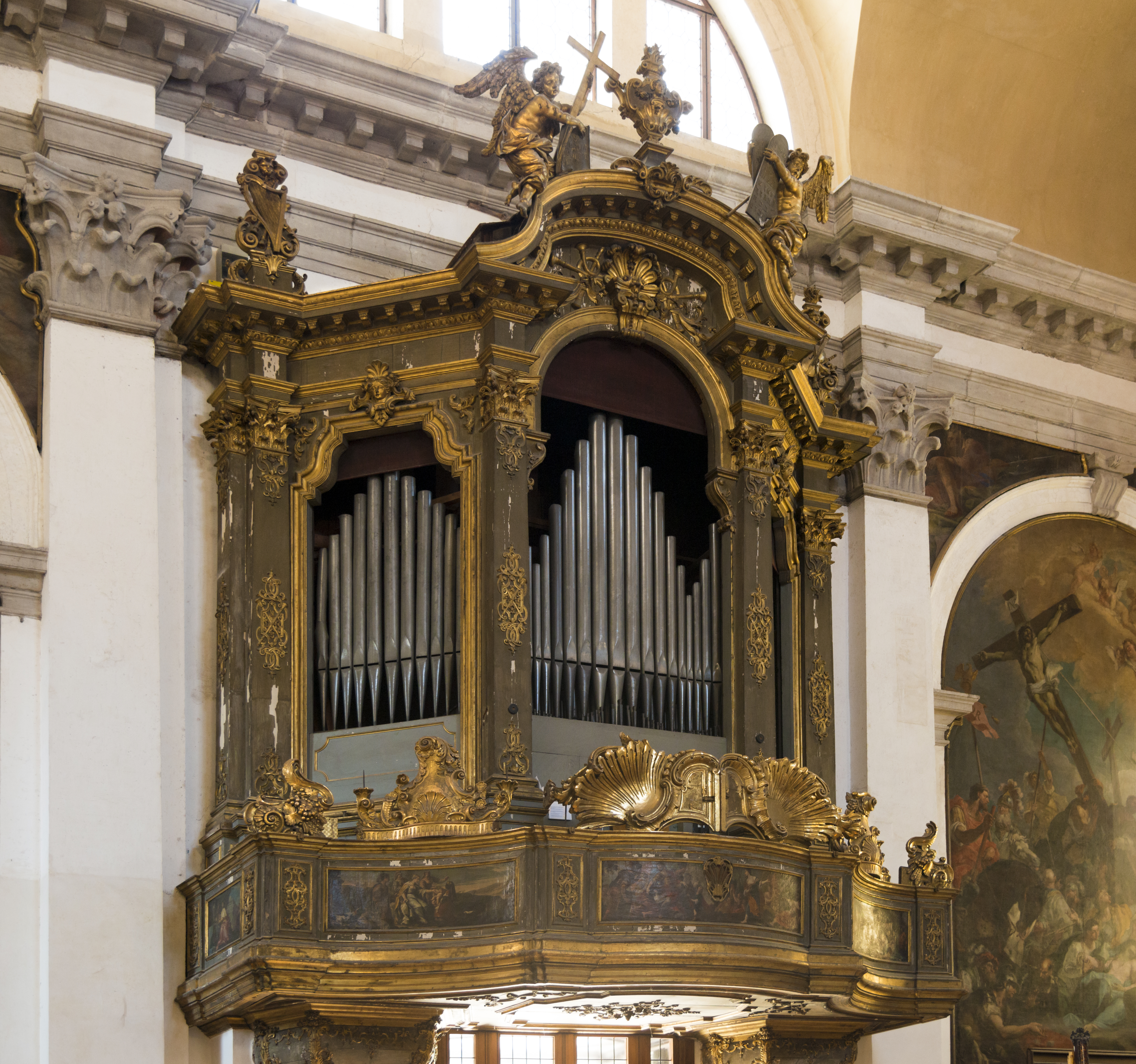
Organ

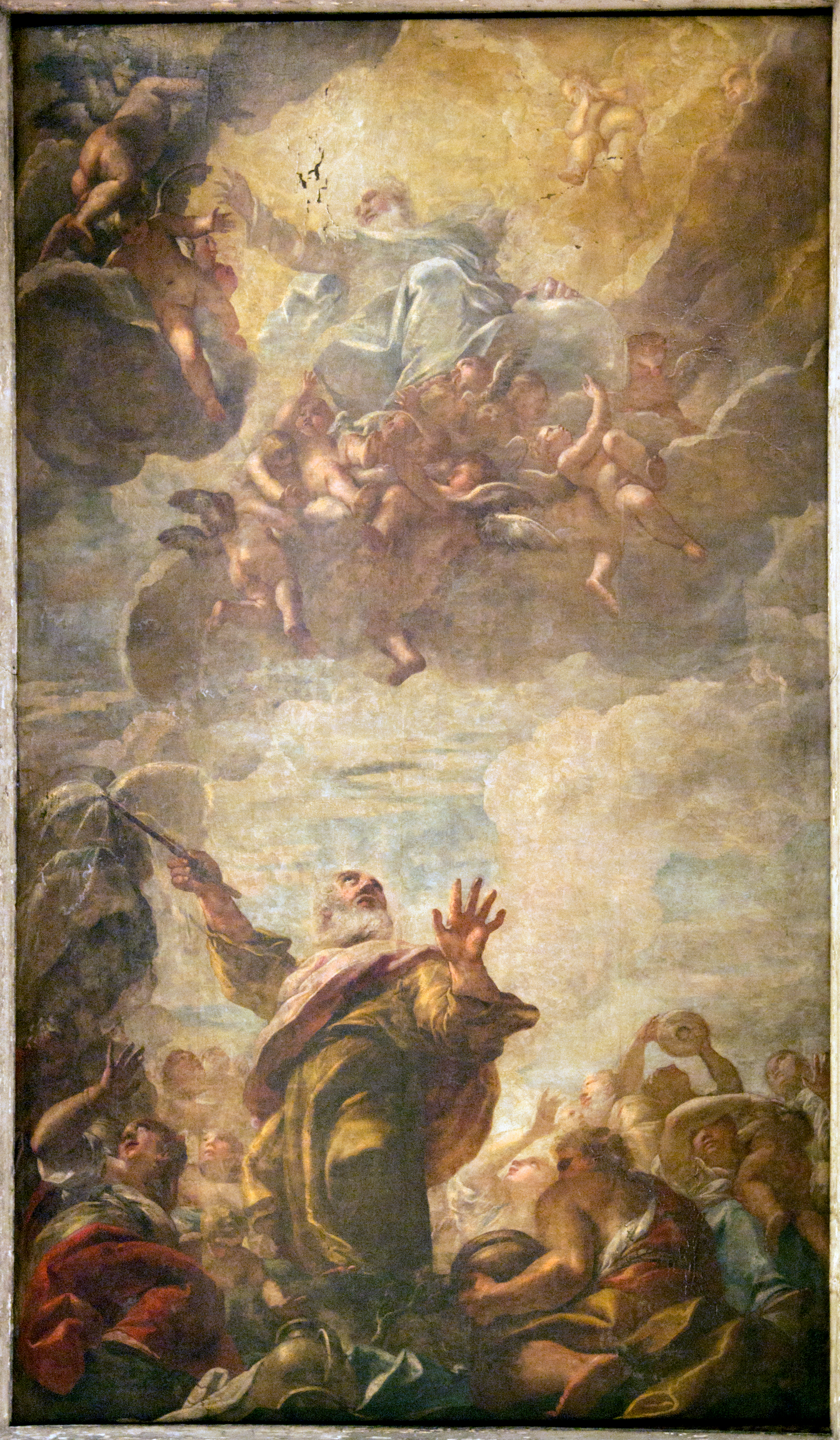
Ceiling

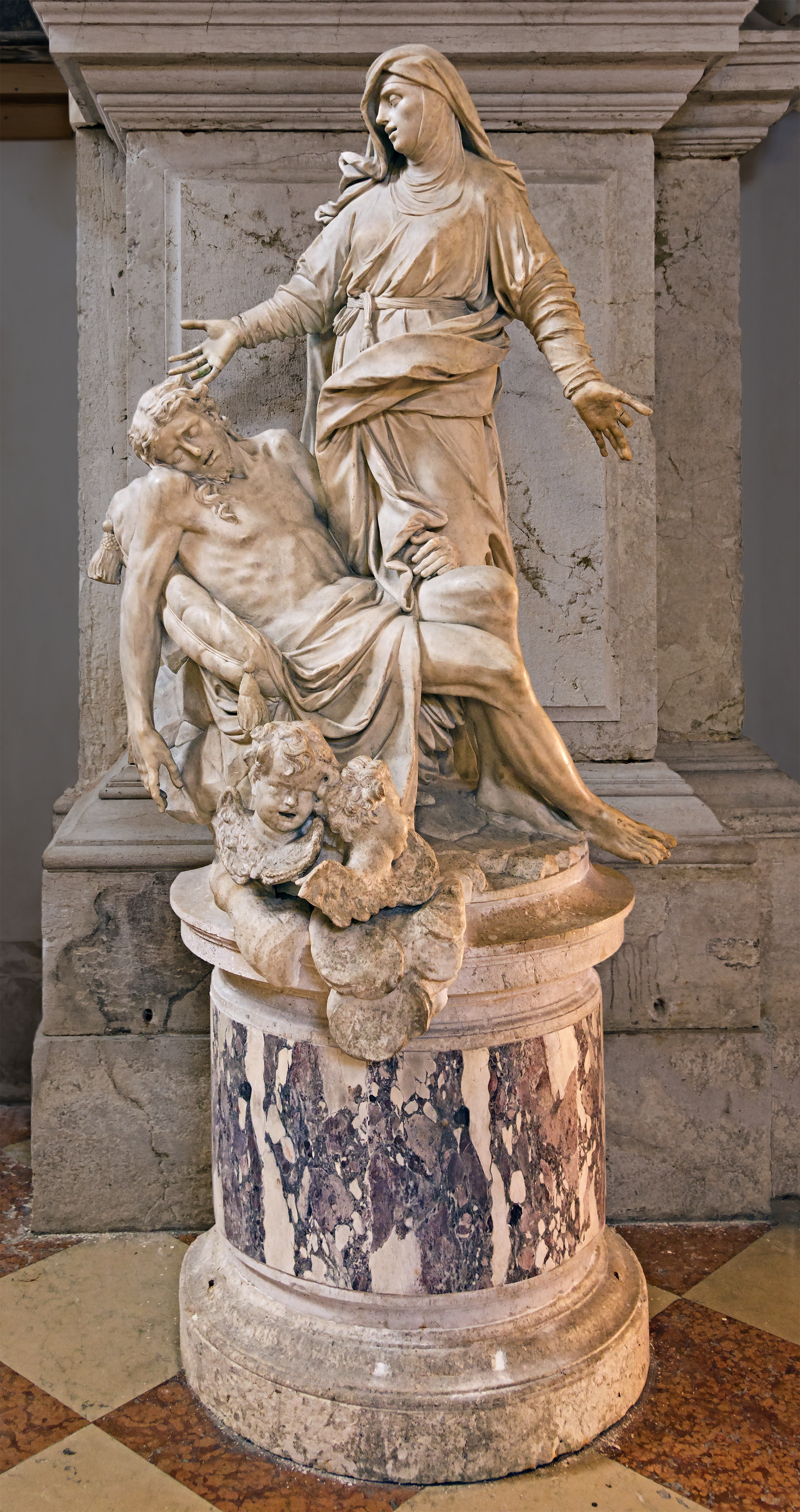
Pietà

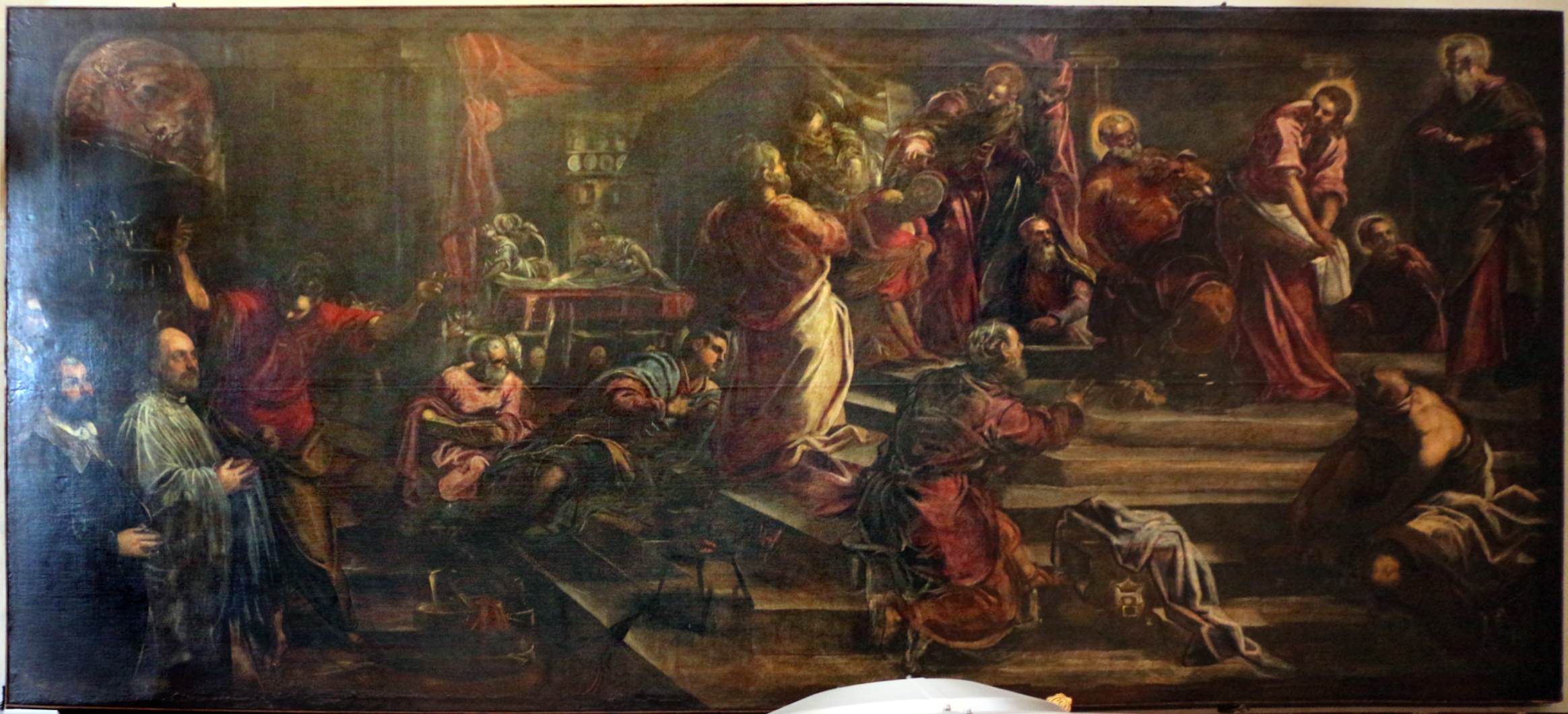
Washing the feet and Agony in the Garden of Gethsemane (upper left corner) by Tintoretto

== Sources ==
- Extracted from Italian Wikipedia.
