= St. Raphael's Cathedral =

St. Raphael's Cathedral or Saint Raphael's Cathedral may refer to:

== India ==
- St. Raphael's Syro-Malabar Catholic Cathedral, Palakkad, Kerala

== Thailand ==
- St. Raphael Cathedral, Surat Thani

== United States ==
- St. Raphael's Cathedral (Dubuque, Iowa)
- Saint Raphael's Cathedral (Madison, Wisconsin)

== See also ==
- St Raphael's Church (disambiguation)
