= Palazzo Michiel dalle Colonne, Venice =

Coordinates: 45.4403°N 12.3352°E

The Palazzo Michiel Dalle Colonne is a Baroque style palace located on the northern bank of the Grand Canal in the sestiere of Cannaregio in Venice, Italy. It is one building south of the junction of Rio del Santissimi Apostoli with Grand Canal, next to the Palazzo Michiel del Brusà and across the Canal from the Rialto Mercato and the Campo della Pescaria. The palace is also referred to as Palazzo Michiel Dalle Colonne a Santa Sofia.

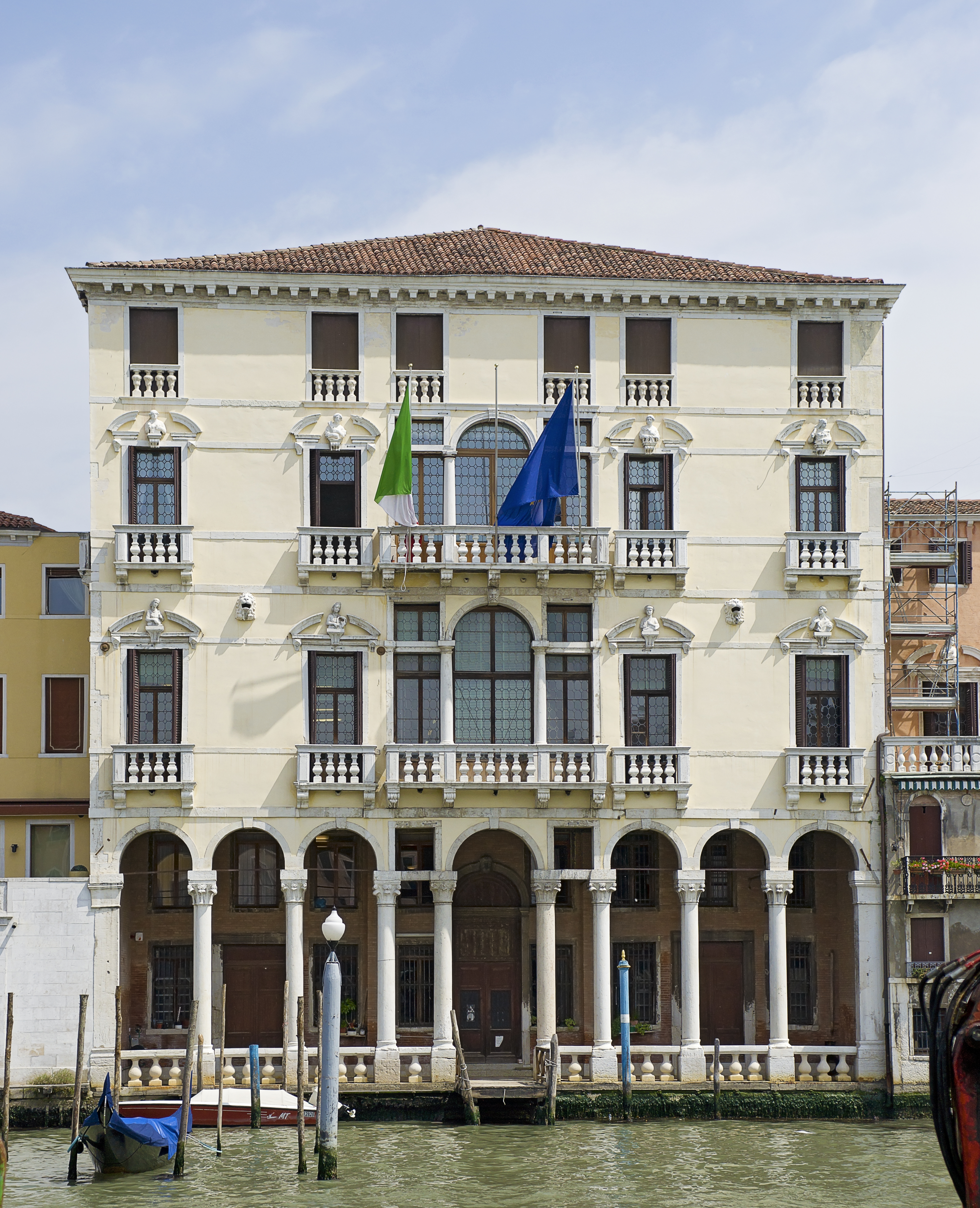
Grand Canal Facade

== History ==
The present facade is mainly due to reconstructions of the original Gothic-Byzantine palace during the 17th and 18th-centuries, the most important rebuilding was by the architect Antonio Gaspari (1656-1723). The palace had many owners during the centuries including the Grimani and Zeno families.

In the 17th-century it was acquired by Ferdinand Charles Gonzaga Nevers, Duke of Mantua and Montferrat. He is described as a prince enamoured by profligate delights, including women, specially those heavy and large, and of infamous character. Tassini, citing the History of Italy by Botta, describes him as keeping the palace as a debauched serraglio, governed by the Countess Calori. Muratori in his Annals describes the Duke as always venturing to carnival of Venice to procure the glory of besting all in the search for pleasure. Others said all night long his palace was the scene of theatrical representations by dissolute women, with music and banqueting, so that he had a worse name than Sardanapalus of old.

However the reign of this Duke was ill-fated. During the War of the Spanish Succession, he favored the French, even selling in 1681 the fortress of Casale Monferrato for profit. He denied this manipulations to his Austrian overlords, but tired of his deceit, in 1707, they exiled him to this palace, where he brought as much statuary, painting and precious items as he could carry. Abandoned by all, on June 30, 1708 he was declared a felon by the emperor, and died a few days later in Padua. He was buried in the church of Santa Sofia of that city.

His heirs soon sold the palace to Count Conigli of Verona, who owned it by 1712, but by 1716 it was owned by Marcantonio Michiel, husband of Giustina Renier. In 1716, Michiel dalle Colonne hosted Frederick Augustus I of Saxony, later Duke of Warsaw, and Karl Albrecht, Elector of Bavaria (and future Charles VII, Holy Roman Emperor) and his mother. The Michiel added a third floor and added interior decorations under the sculptor Michelangelo Morlaiter and painter Francesco Zanchi. The palace was next inherited by the Martinengo family.

The palace, under the Martinengo underwent major reconstruction after the mid-19th-century. In the 20th century, the palace served many functions including the offices of the Fascist Party (Casa del Fascio) and other ministries. The 18th-century frescoes in the palace by Franchi depict the Allegory of Victory, Triumph of Merit, and Allegory of Abundance in the piano nobile and in the floor above, Allegory of Peace.
