= Giovanni Antonio Guardi =

Italian painter (1699–1760)

- Born: 27 May 1699; Vienna
- Died: January 1760 (aged 60); Venice, Italy
- Known for: Painter
- Movement: Orientalist

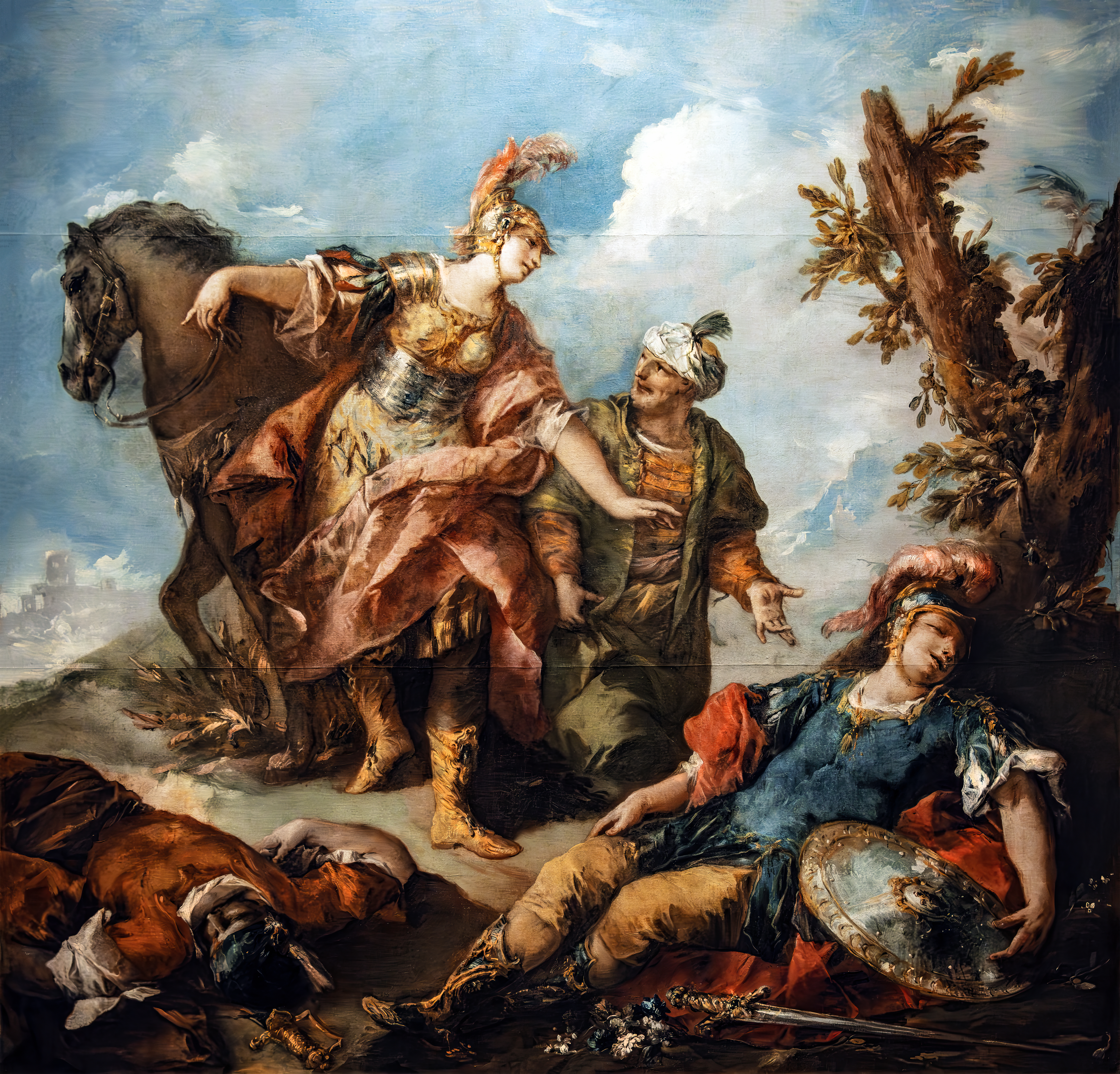
Herminia and Vaprino Find the Wounded Tancred, 1750s. A scene from La Gerusalemme liberata by Tasso.

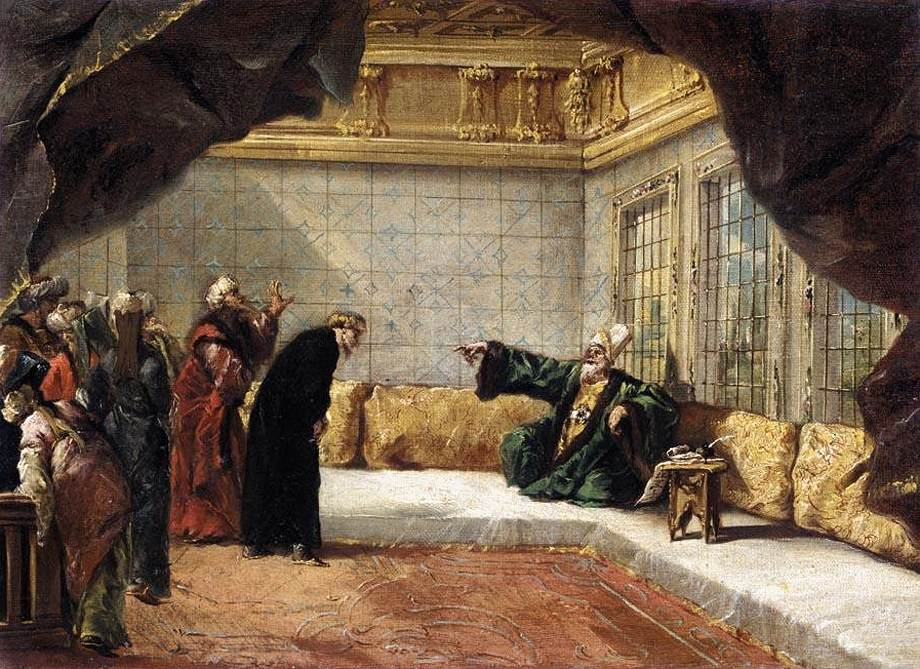
The Armenian Priest Dergumidas before the Grand Vizier (1743)

Giovanni Antonio Guardi (1699 – 23 January 1760), also known as Gianantonio Guardi, was an Italian painter and nobleman. Guardi was one of the founders of the Venetian Academy in 1756.

== Biography ==
He was born in Vienna into a family of nobility from Trentino. His father Domenico (born in 1678) was a Baroque painter. Gianantonio and his brothers Niccolò and Francesco (also painters), later inherited the family workshop after their father's death in 1716. They probably all contributed as a team to some of the larger commissions later attributed to his brother Francesco Guardi. His sister Maria Cecilia married the pre-eminent Veneto-European painter of his epoch, Giovanni Battista Tiepolo.

He may have received his artistic training in Vienna, where he is first recorded in 1719, but had established a workshop in Venice by 1730. Among his first important clients was the connoisseur and collector Johann Matthias von der Schulenburg, for whom Guardi created numerous paintings with an Orientalist theme.

He produced copies after the work of other artists, as well as a series of originals with Turkish-inspired interiors as easel pictures for private decorations. Antonio Guardi trained his younger brothers Nicolò and Francesco in his workshop, the latter working closely with him as a figure painter before establishing himself as a vedutista in the late 1750s.

A founder member of the Accademia Veneziana in 1756, the elder Guardi produced several works for churches in Venice, notably in the Church of the Angelo San Raffaele, as well as decorative cycles for palaces and villas in the city and the surrounding countryside. Francesco Casanova was among his pupils.

He died in Venice in 1760.

== See also ==
- List of Orientalist artists
- Orientalism
