= San Rafael, Antioquia =

San Rafael
- Municipality and town
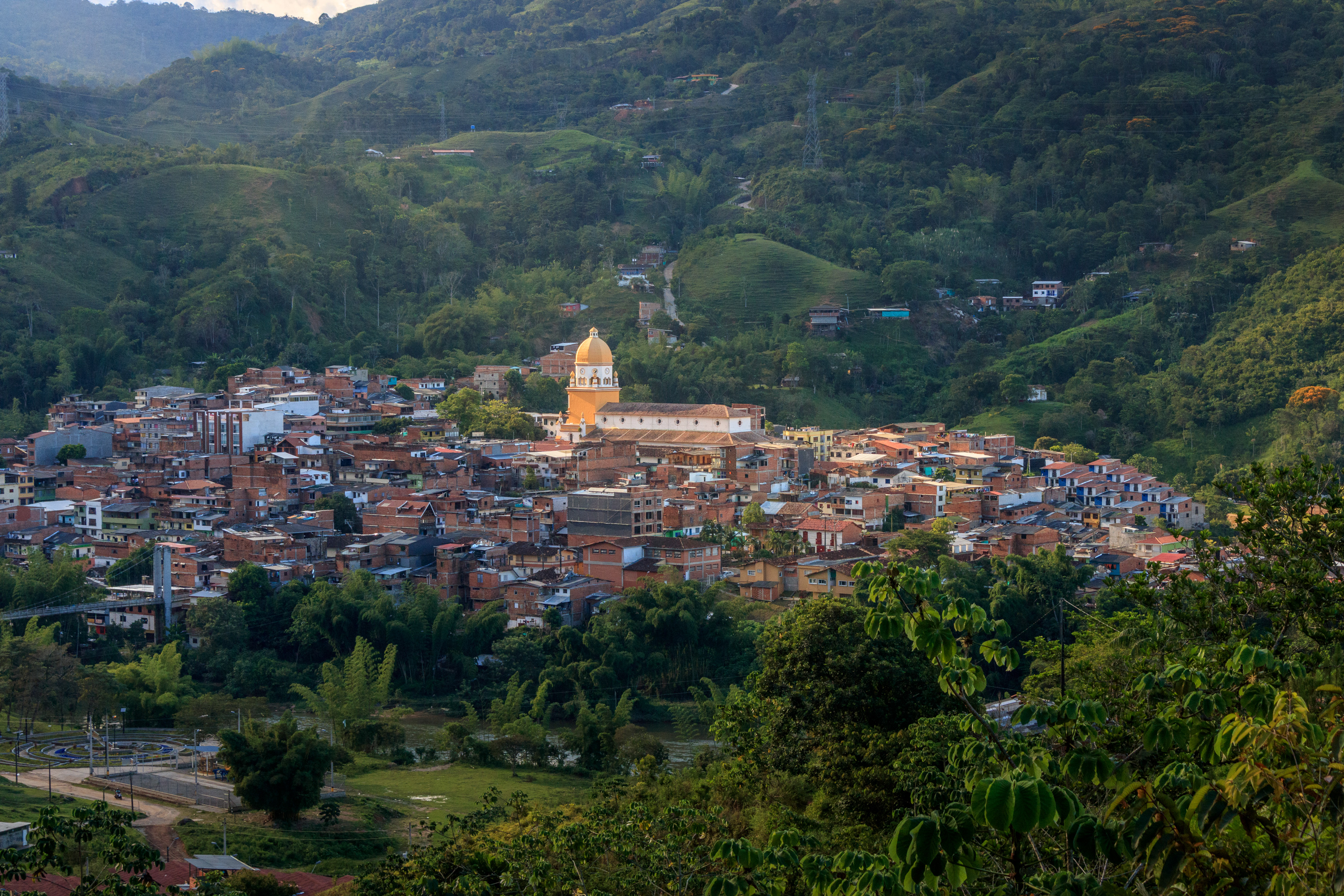

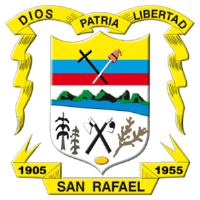
- Flag Coat of arms

- Location of the municipality and town of San Rafael, Antioquia in the Antioquia Department of Colombia

- Location in Colombia
- Coordinates: 6°17′42″N 75°1′41″W
- Country: Colombia
- Department: Antioquia Department
- Subregion: Eastern

Area
  - Total: 362 km^{2} (140 sq mi)

Population (Census 2018)
  - Total: 12,578
- Time zone: UTC-5 (Colombia Standard Time)

San Rafael is a town and municipality in Antioquia Department, Colombia. Part of the subregion of Eastern Antioquia.

The town was founded in 1864 by a group of miners who were attracted to the abundance of gold in the region. It is also rich in water resources. The population was 12,578 at the 2018 census.

== Climate ==
Climate data for San Rafael (Violetas Las), elevation 1,016 m (3,333 ft), (1981–2010)
Month	Jan	Feb	Mar	Apr	May	Jun	Jul	Aug	Sep	Oct	Nov	Dec	Year
Mean daily maximum °C (°F)	28.3 (82.9)	28.9 (84.0)	29.0 (84.2)	28.9 (84.0)	29.2 (84.6)	29.3 (84.7)	29.3 (84.7)	29.6 (85.3)	28.9 (84.0)	28.8 (83.8)	28.2 (82.8)	27.9 (82.2)	28.9 (84.0)
Daily mean °C (°F)	22.5 (72.5)	22.7 (72.9)	22.9 (73.2)	23.0 (73.4)	23.2 (73.8)	23.1 (73.6)	23.0 (73.4)	23.1 (73.6)	22.9 (73.2)	22.6 (72.7)	22.5 (72.5)	22.5 (72.5)	22.8 (73.0)
Mean daily minimum °C (°F)	17.5 (63.5)	17.7 (63.9)	18.2 (64.8)	18.5 (65.3)	18.1 (64.6)	18.0 (64.4)	17.5 (63.5)	17.4 (63.3)	17.9 (64.2)	18.0 (64.4)	18.1 (64.6)	18.0 (64.4)	17.9 (64.2)
Average precipitation mm (inches)	123.7 (4.87)	149.7 (5.89)	210.4 (8.28)	354.4 (13.95)	393.1 (15.48)	310.2 (12.21)	274.8 (10.82)	346.3 (13.63)	456.0 (17.95)	488.2 (19.22)	356.7 (14.04)	198.1 (7.80)	3,661.4 (144.15)
Average precipitation days (≥ 1.0 mm)	13	14	17	22	23	20	19	20	23	25	23	17	233
Average relative humidity (%)	86	85	86	86	86	85	84	84	85	87	88	87	86
Mean monthly sunshine hours	151.9	141.2	136.4	135.0	151.9	165.0	198.4	192.2	168.0	148.8	132.0	130.2	1,851
Mean daily sunshine hours	4.9	5.0	4.4	4.5	4.9	5.5	6.4	6.2	5.6	4.8	4.4	4.2	5.1
Source: Instituto de Hidrologia Meteorologia y Estudios Ambientales

== See also ==
- St Raphael's Church
