= Angelo San Raffaele, Venice =

Church in Venice, Italy

Angelo San Raffaele
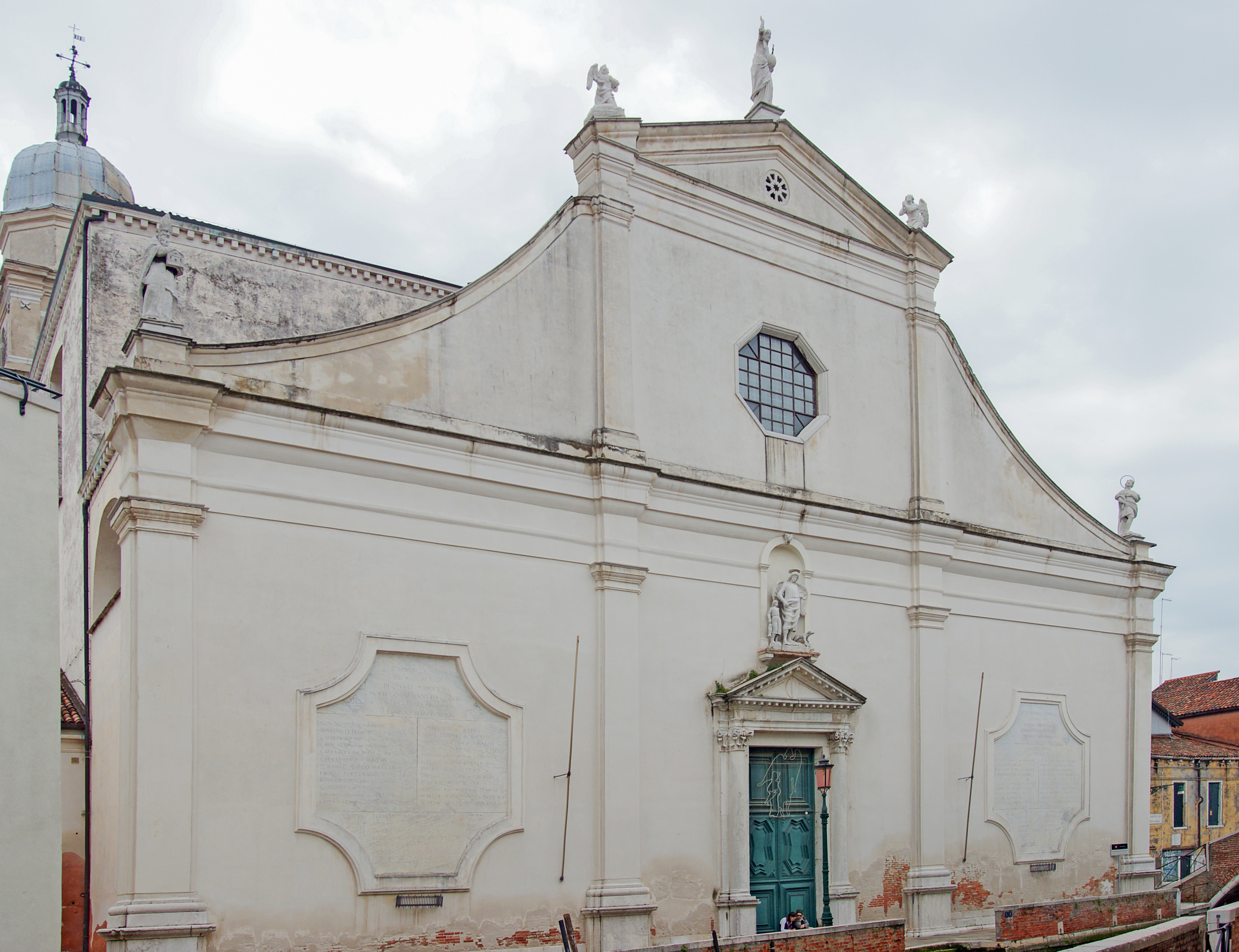
- Facade of Chiesa dell'Angelo Raffaele

- Location within Venice Location within Italy

Religion
- Affiliation: Roman Catholic
- Province: Venice

Location
- Location: Venice, Italy 45°25′57.02″N 12°19′8.37″E
- Interactive map of Angelo San Raffaele

The Chiesa dell'Angelo Raffaele (English: "Church of the Angel Raphael") is a church in Venice, northern Italy, located in the Dorsoduro sestiere. San Raffaele Arcangelo church is one of the only two churches in Venice that are possible to walk all around. It is located in Dorsoduro neighbourhood, close to San Basilio water bus stop.

== History ==
According to tradition, this church was one of the eight churches founded in Venice by St Magnus of Oderzo. The church suffered fires in 889, 1106 and 1149, each time being rebuilt. At the beginning of the 17th century the edifice was in poor condition, and was therefore demolished and rebuilt. Works were finished in 1743–1749.

The church plan is a Greek cross, with the façade facing a minor canal named after the church, rio dell'Angelo Raffaele. The interior houses sculptures by Sebastiano Mariani and Michelangelo Morlaiter. Among the statues is one of the Archangel Raphael leading a boy with a fish; the archangel was a patron saint of fishermen.

The center ceiling of the nave and the Baptistry has a decoration by Francesco Fontebasso. The present organ was built in 1821 by the brothers Antonio and Agostino Callido, son of the more famous organ maker, Gaetano Callido. It was restored by Giacomo Bazzani and his sons in 1848, and more recently by the Tamburini family.

This small church is in a distant corner of Venice; it is best known for the painted organ doors depicting the Story of Tobias, attributed to the late 18th century vedutista Gianantonio Guardi. While Guardi is also known for his misty lagoon vistas of Venice, in this religious painting the scene explodes with scintillating brushstrokes. It is a parting demonstration that the Venetian school still had a flash of originality. The pittura di tocco (touch painting) world of these paintings exists in a world where clouds and bodies are feathered with color. A last firework of paint dabbed just a few decades before the real blasts of Napoleonic grapeshot were heard by the last Doge.

Additional works in the church include:

- Assumption of the Virgin by Andrea Vicentino (first altar on right)
- St Francis receives the Stigmata by Palma il Giovane (second altar on right)
- Last Supper by Andrea del Friso
- Last Supper by Bonifacio Veronese
- St Alvise Bishop with Saints Sebastian, Jerome, and John the Evangelist by Francesco Fontebasso
- The Centurion before Christ by Andrea del Friso
- St Helena finds the True Cross by Giovanni Battista Zelotti

== Exterior ==
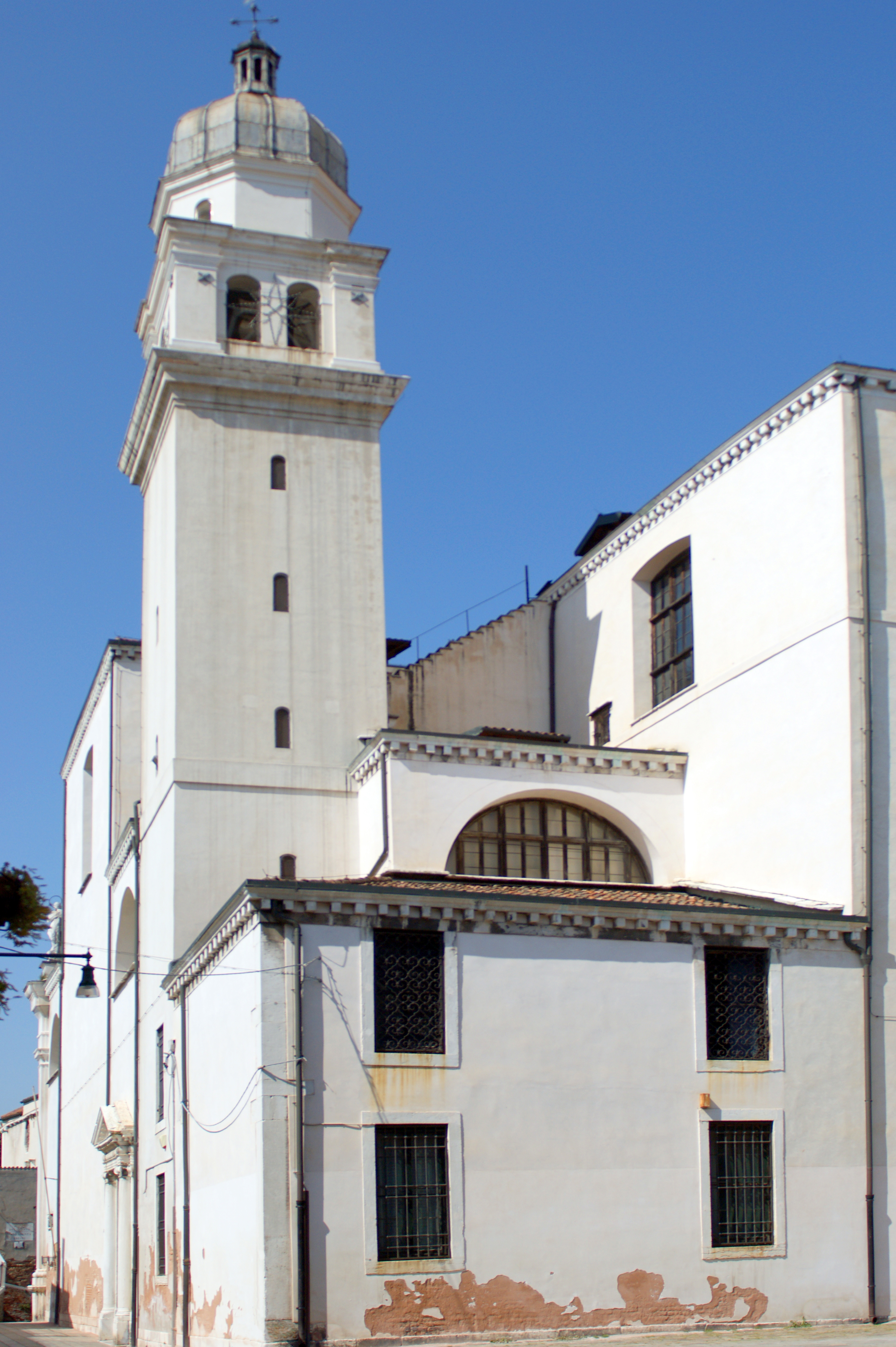
Bell tower and apse

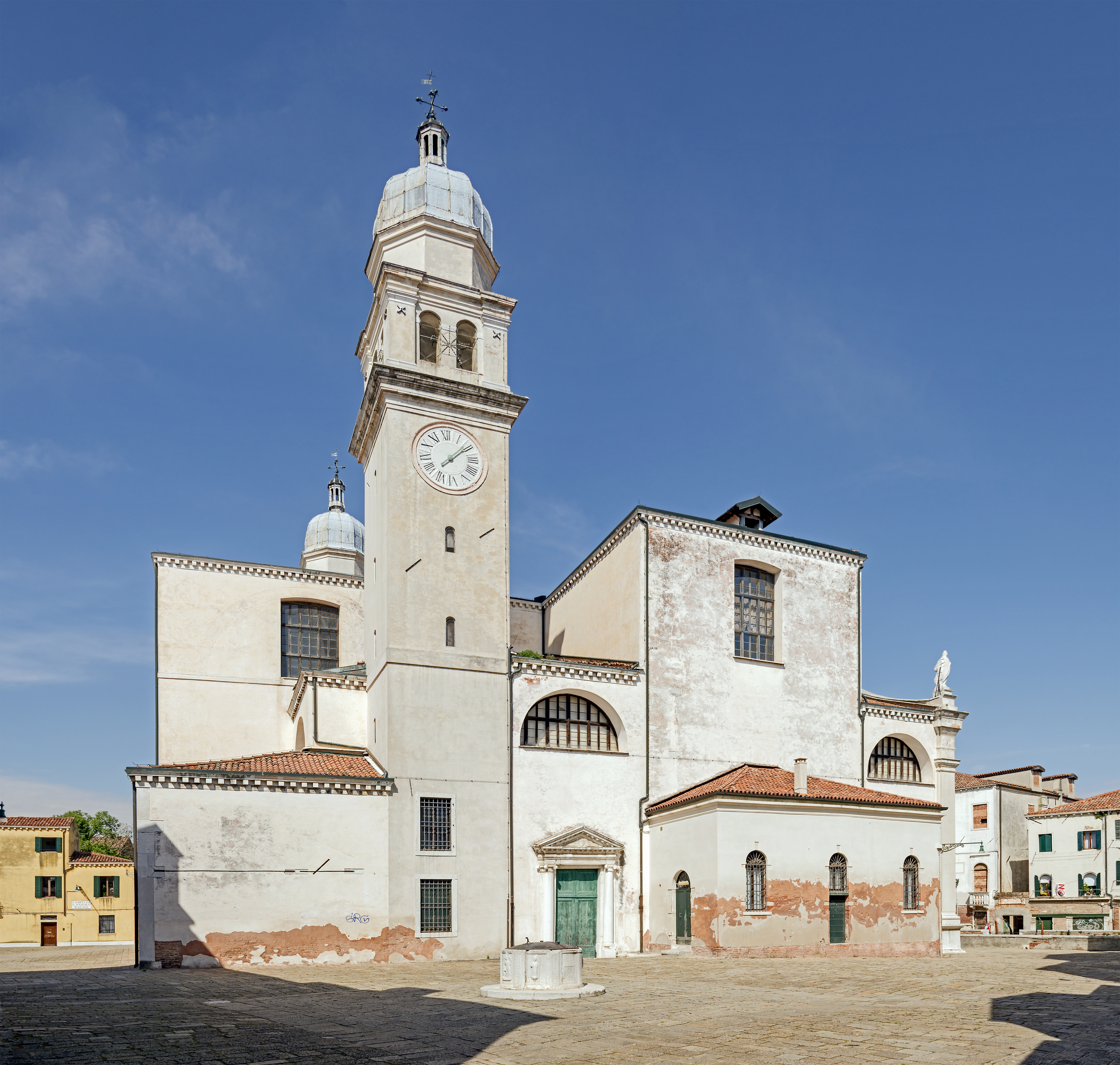
View from Campo dietro il Cimitero

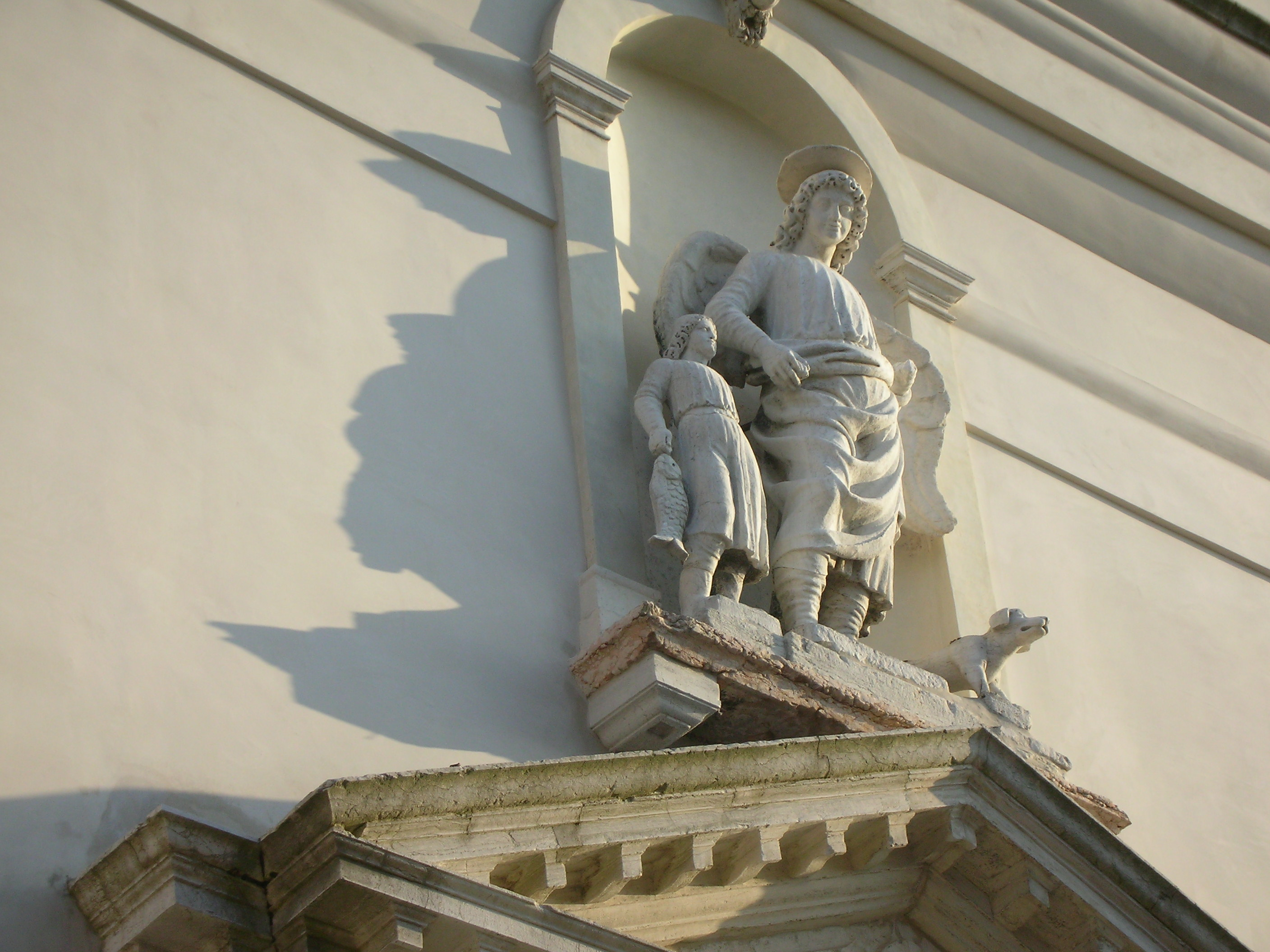
Statues of Tobias and Raffaele over entrance.

== Interior ==
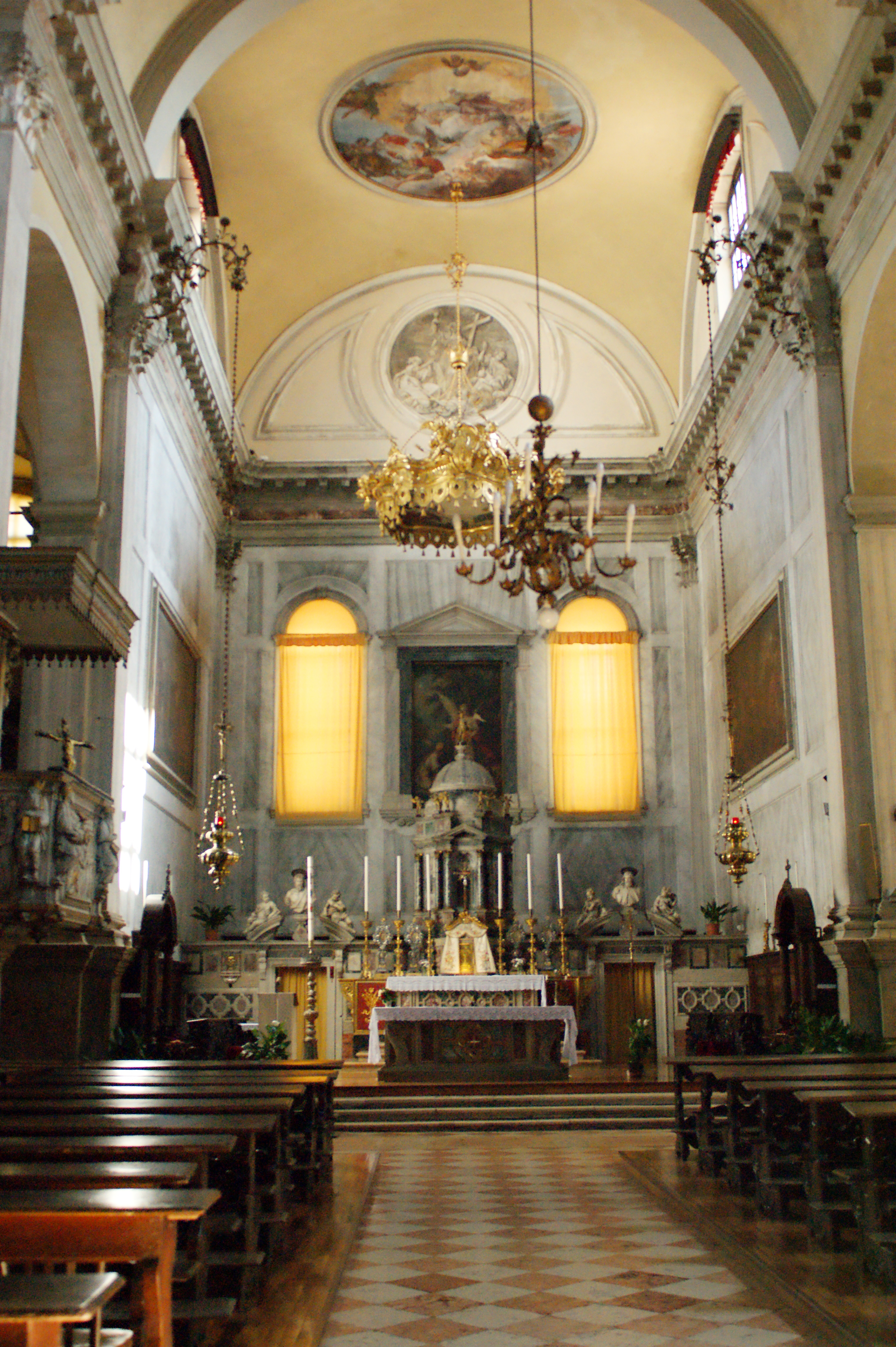
Interior

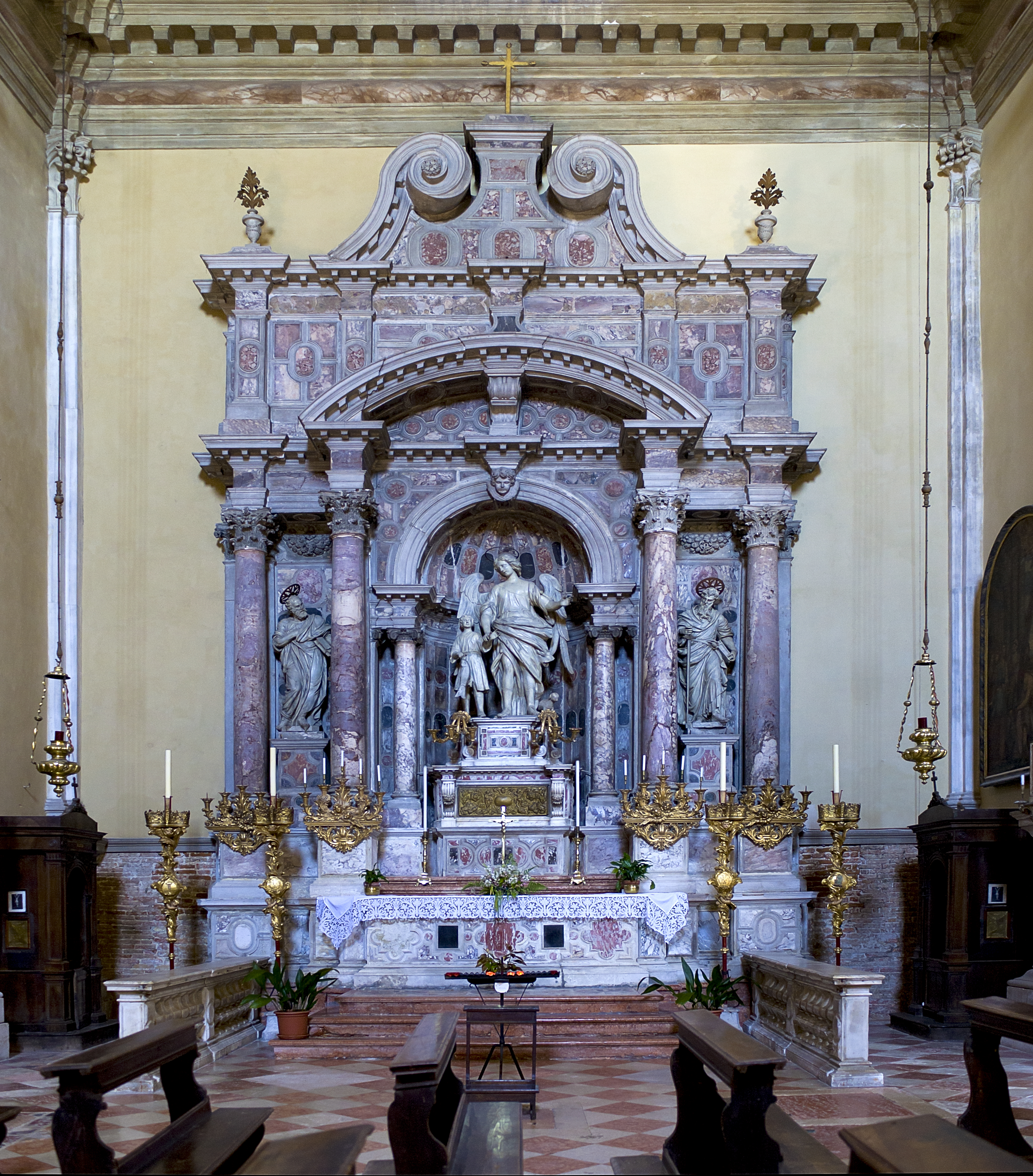
Altar of the Archangel Raphael

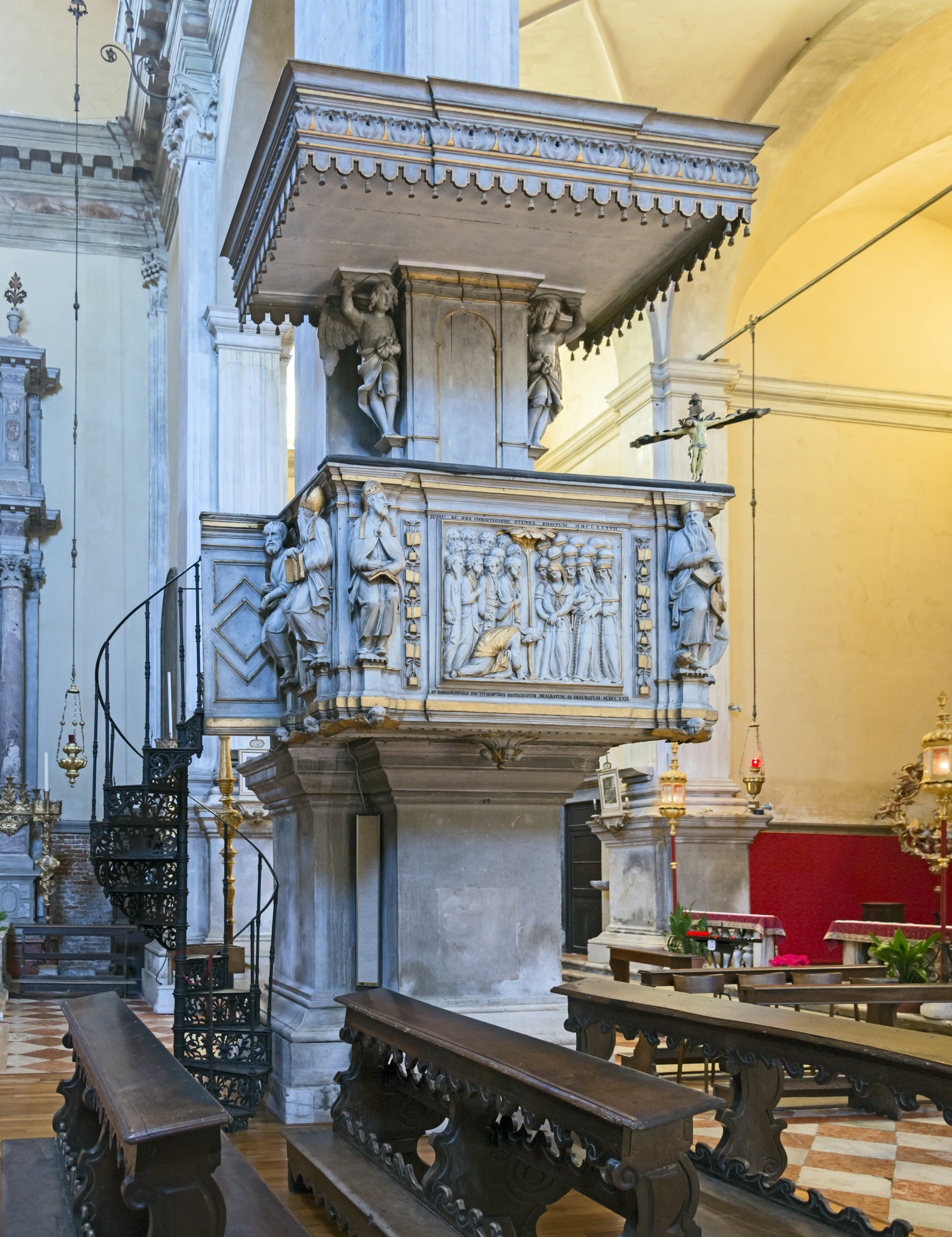
Pulpit

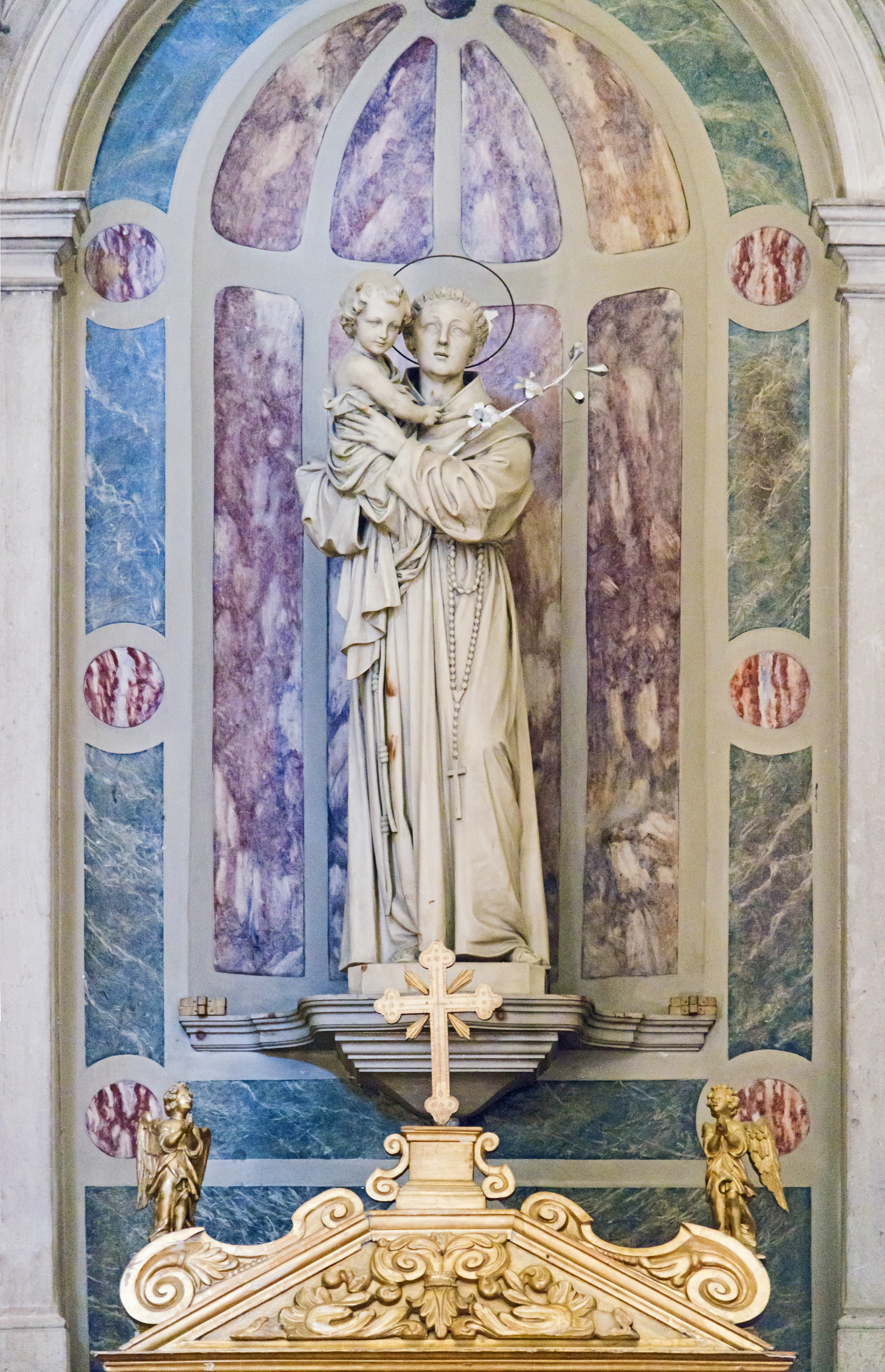
Chapel of St.Antony of Padua

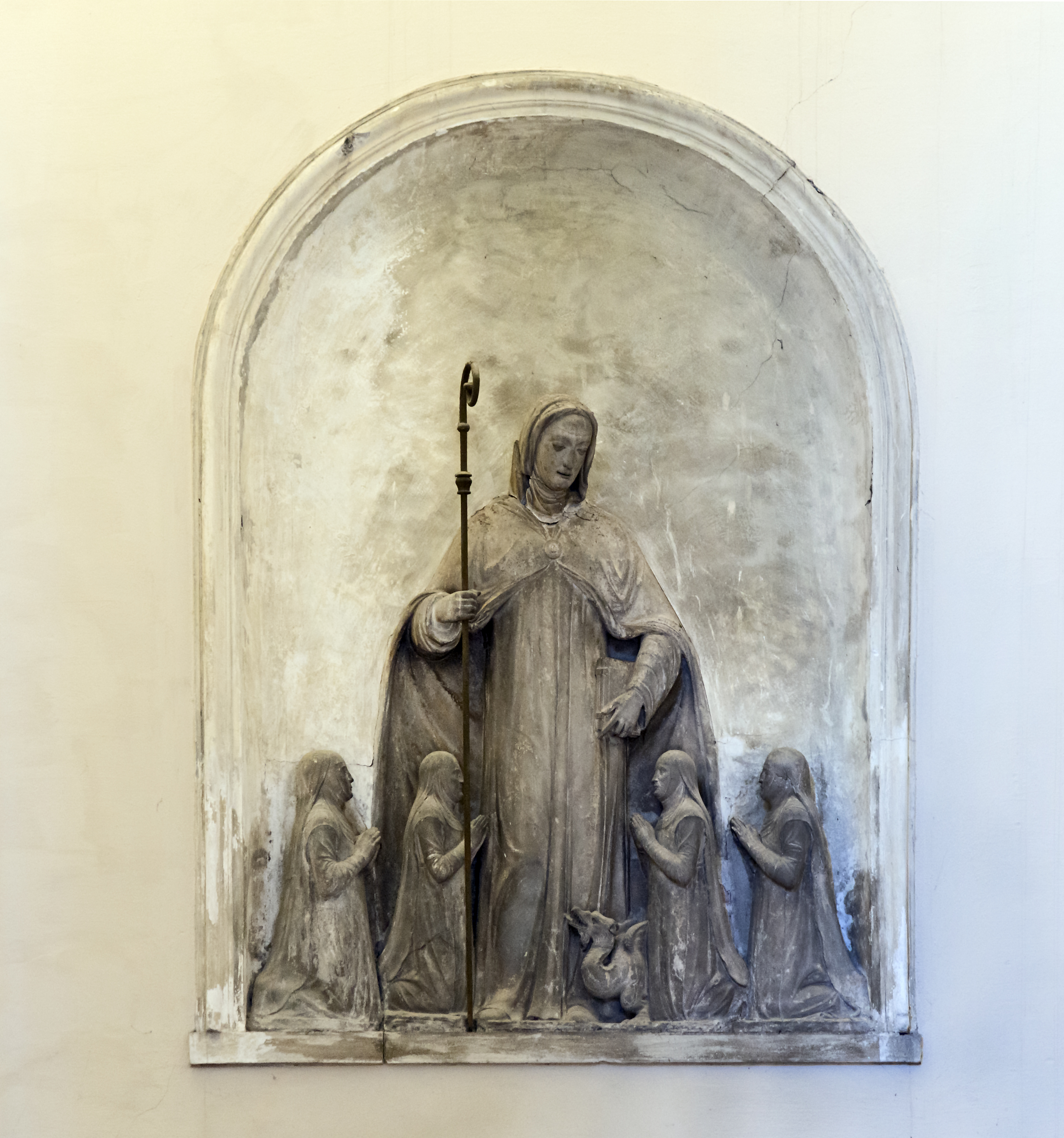
Virgin of Mercy - fifteenth century

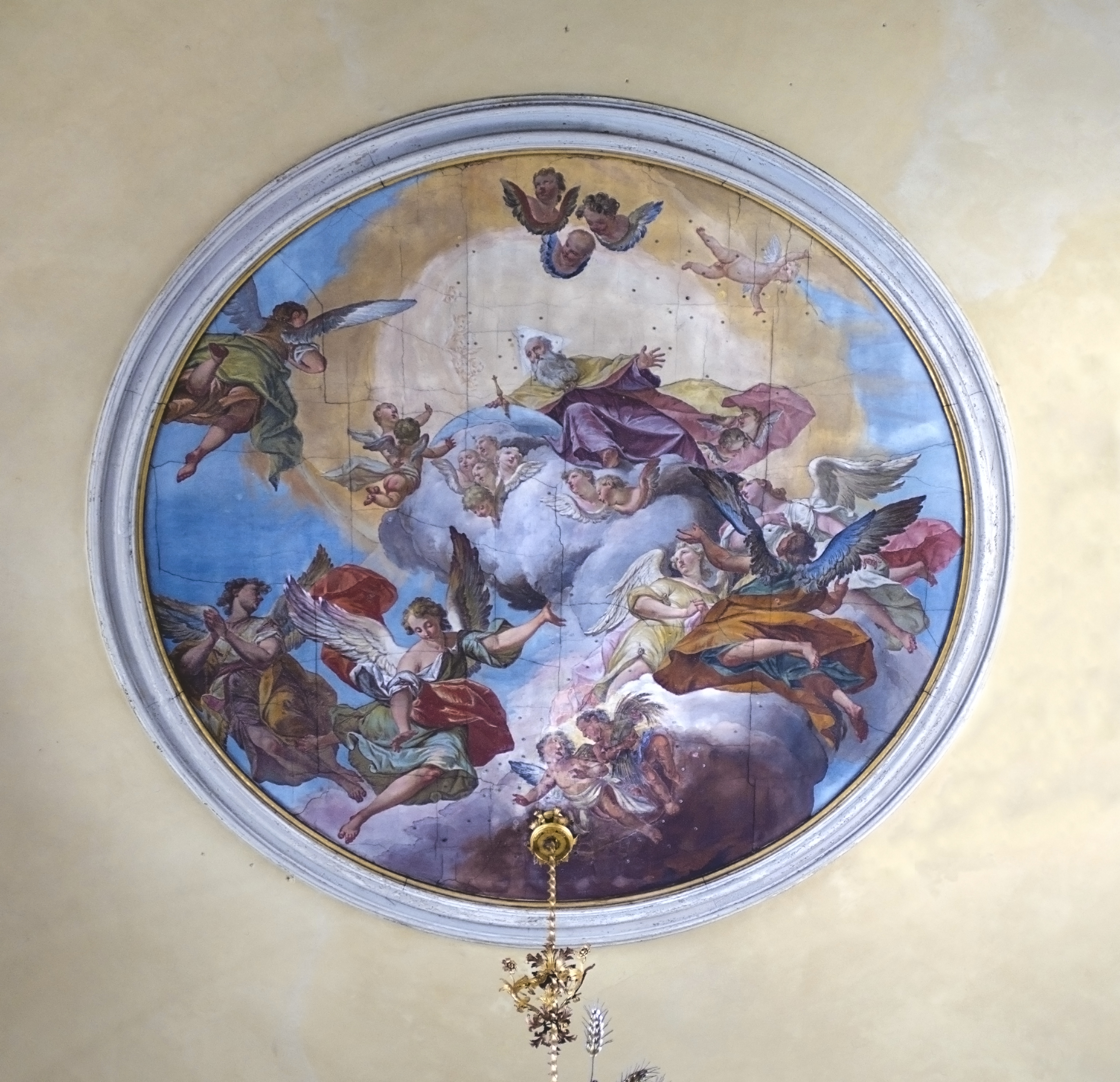
Ceiling Choir

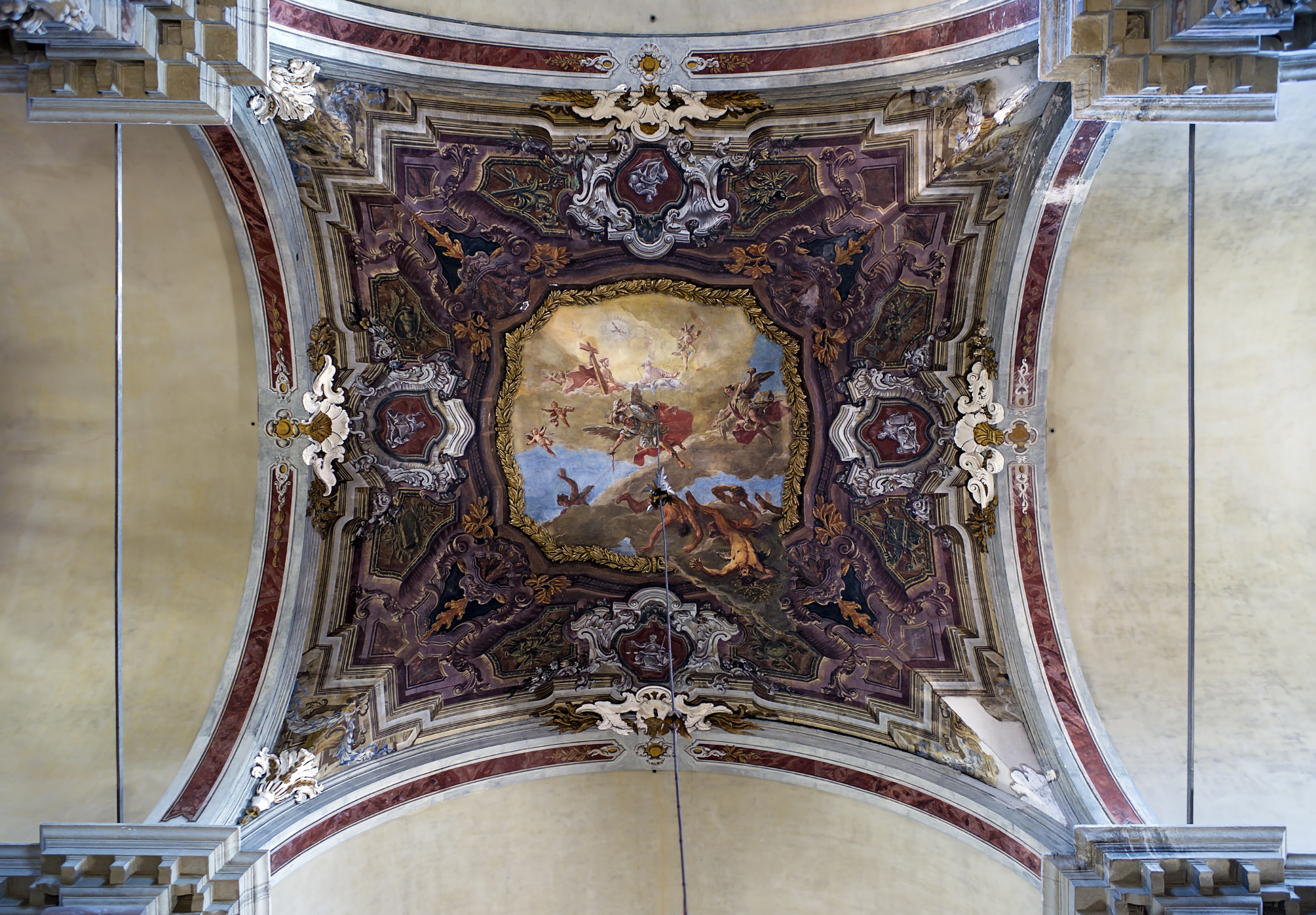
Ceiling

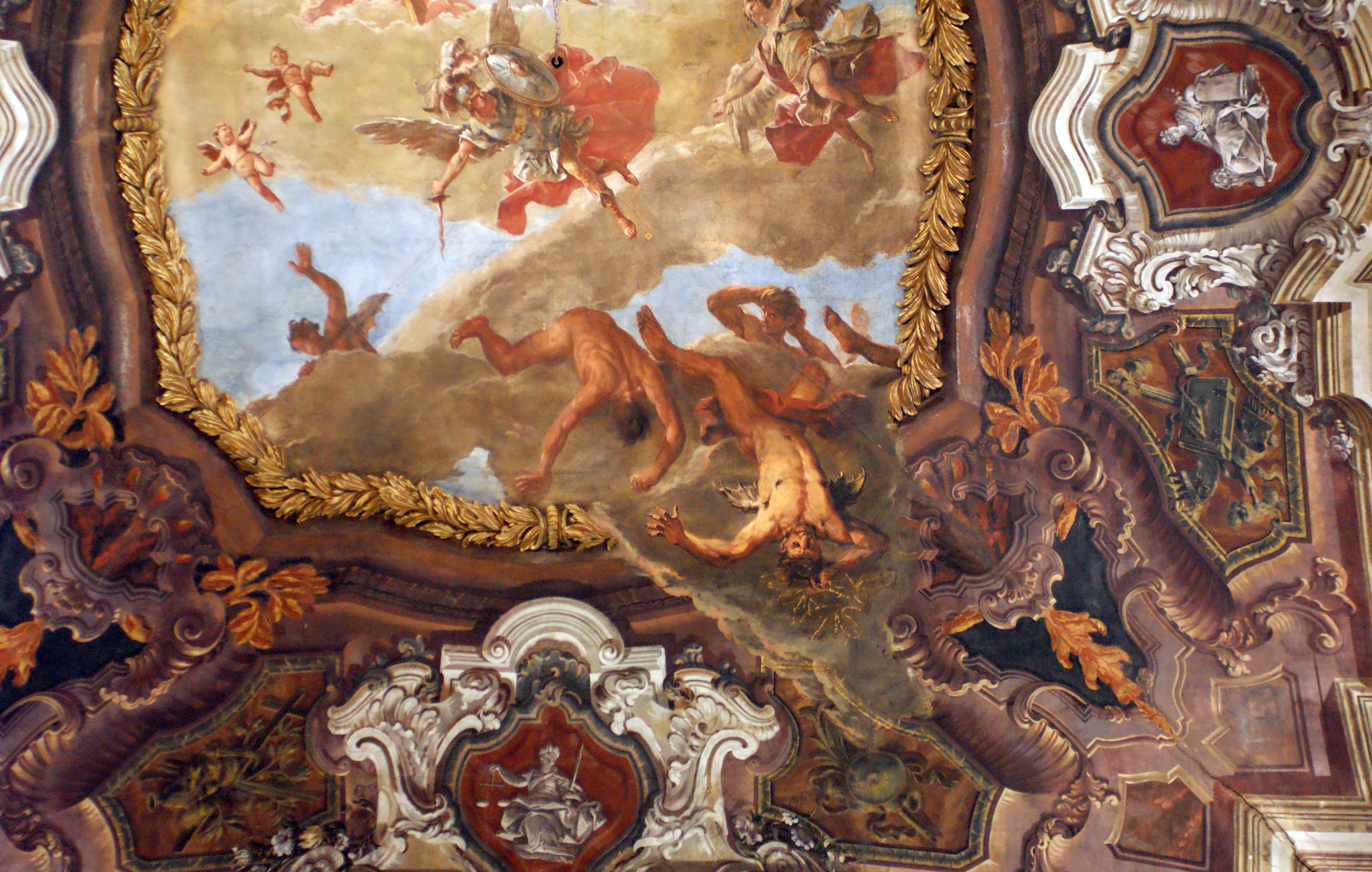
Ceiling detail

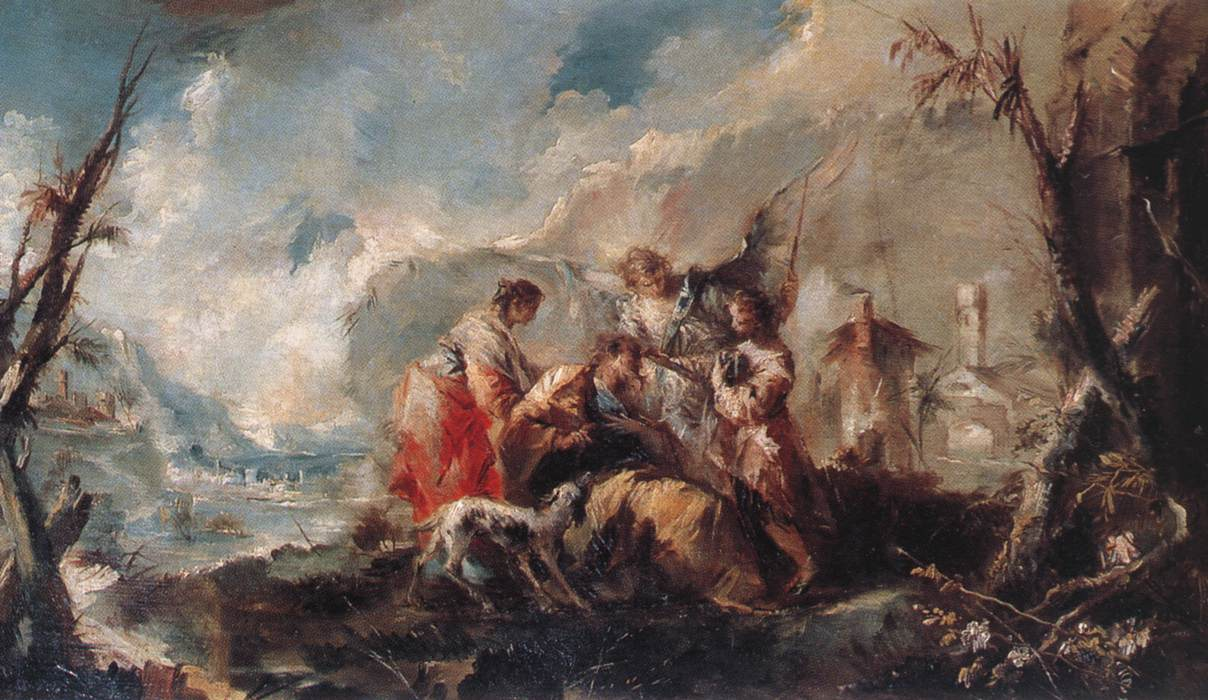
Healing of Tobias' Father
