= St Raphael's Church, San Rafael =

Church building in San Rafael, Colombia

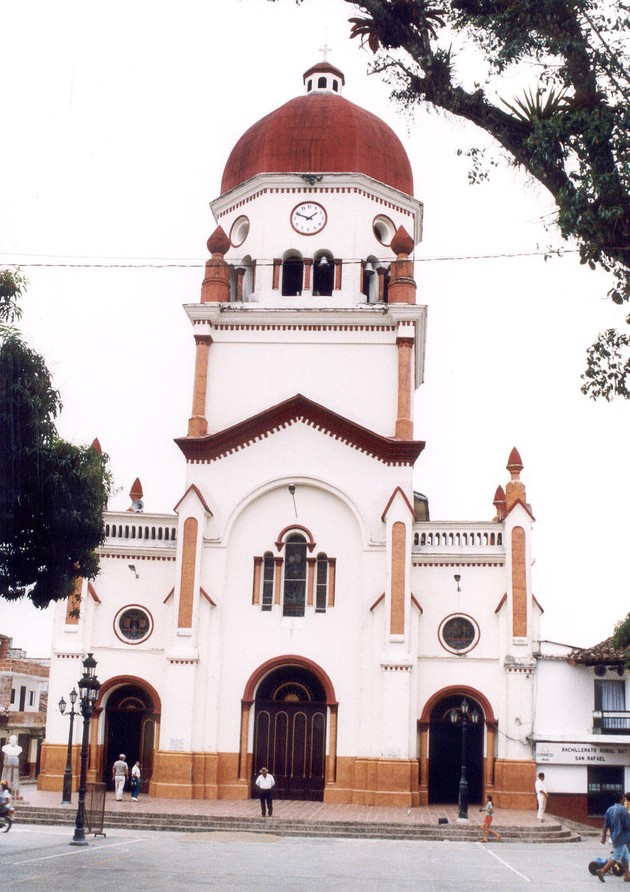
St Raphael's Church.

St Raphael's Church (Spanish: Iglesia de San Rafael Arcángel) is a church in San Rafael, Antioquia, Colombia. The church is part of the Roman Catholic Diocese of Sonsón–Rionegro, dedicated to the Archangel Raphael.

== History ==
The first church was built on the site between 1864 and 1866 by Juan Mazo and the brothers Juan and Agustín Mira, and was a small chapel made of straw and bahareque known as El Sueldo. Due to the distance from other churches, the Bishop of Medellín, Herrera Restrepo, created a new parish, with José de Jesús Correa as the priest. He believed that the chapel and the village were based in a very remote and narrow location. The inhabitants of El Sueldo moved to live near the river, and Correa began building a new church in August 1904, with plans by the architect Emigdio Rincón. The construction of the building was completed by Correa's successors.

The church has three naves and one tower. Inside there are three altars: one is the high altar, another has the image of the Archangel Rafael, and the other has the image of Our Lady of Mount Carmel.

The facade of the church faces onto the main square of the town, with a bust of Correa.
