= St. Raphael's Cathedral, Palakkad =

Church in Palakkad, India

Coordinates: 10.7707°N 76.6402°E

St. Raphael's Syro-Malabar Catholic Cathedral Church, also called St. Raphael Cathedral, is an Eastern Catholic church located in Palakkad district, Kerala, India. It is the cathedral church of the Syro-Malabar Catholic Diocese of Palghat (Eparchia Palghatensis), which was created in 1974 through the papal bull titled "Apostolico requirente" of Pope Paul VI. The patron of the church is the archangel St. Raphael.

Fr. Joshy Pullikkottil is the current vicar of the church, which is under the pastoral responsibility of the Bishop of Palghat.

== Religious organisations working under the parish ==
- Thirubalasakyam
- CLC
- KCYM
- Mathrusangam
- Vincent De Paul
- Franciscan 3rd Order

== Institutions under the parish ==
- St. Raphael's Cathedral School (CBSE)

== Sisters from the parish ==
1	Rev. Sr. Agnasta Vazhapilli
2	Rev. Sr. Elizabeth Mundacal
3	Rev. Sr. Linat
4	Rev. Sr. Phini Mathew
5	Rev. Sr. Sheeba

== Priests from the parish ==
1	Sebastian S.J. Vazhapilli
2	Fr. Davis M.S.F Chackalackal
3	Fr. Jairaj Kidangan
