= Michelangelo Morlaiter =

Italian artist (1729–1806)

Michelangelo Morlaiter (Venice, 23 December 1729 – 1806) was an Italian painter, active mainly in Venice. He was one of the founding members and professor of the Accademia di Scoltura, Pittura, ed Architettura Civile in Venice in 1766.

His father, Giovanni Maria Morlaiter, was a prominent sculptor. One of Michelangelo's pupils was Francesco Maggiotto.

== Works in Venice ==
- Palazzo Grassi, Frescoes
- Palazzo Palazzo Michiel dalle Colonne, stucco decoration
- Gallerie dell'Accademia, sala 18, Venice awards the arts.
- Church of San Bartolomeo, canvas in ceiling of presbytery, depicting San Bartolomeo in gloria.
- Church of Angelo San Raffaele, wall frescoes of Archangel Raphael and Tobias and ceiling 'God the Father in Glory of Angels.
- Church of San Moisè, Angels behind Meyring's statue at main altar
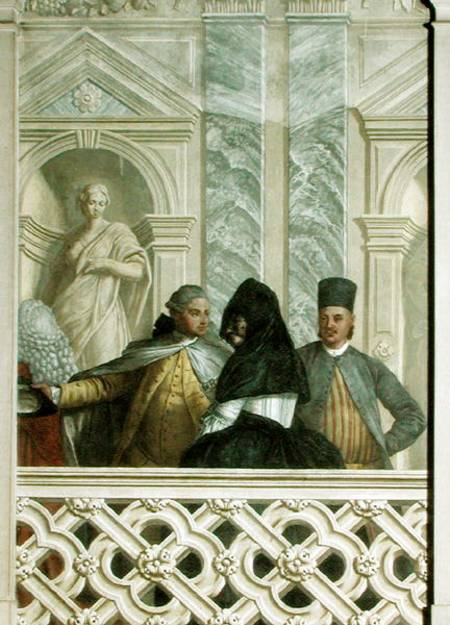
Fresco in Palazzo Grassi, Venice

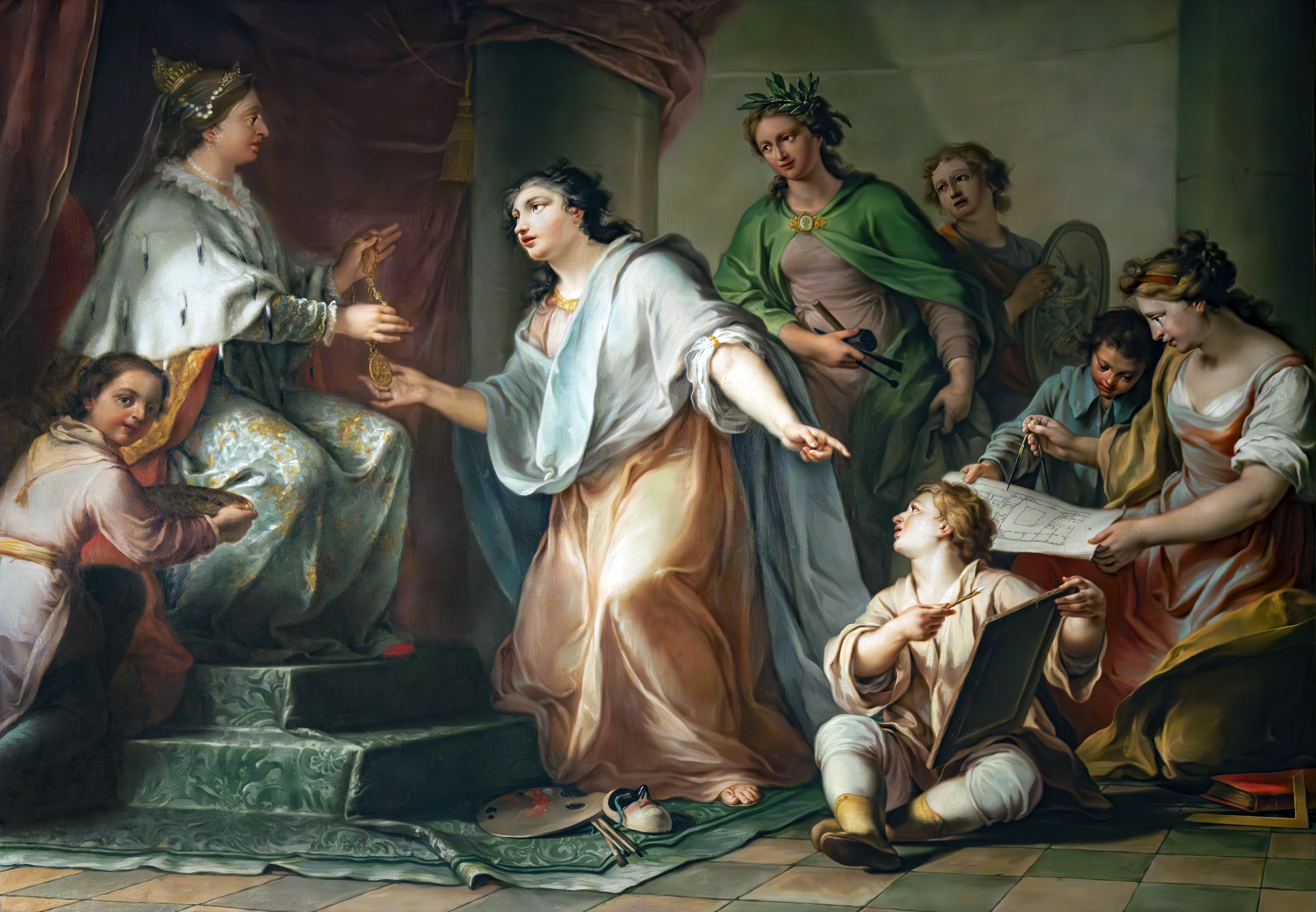
Venice awards the arts

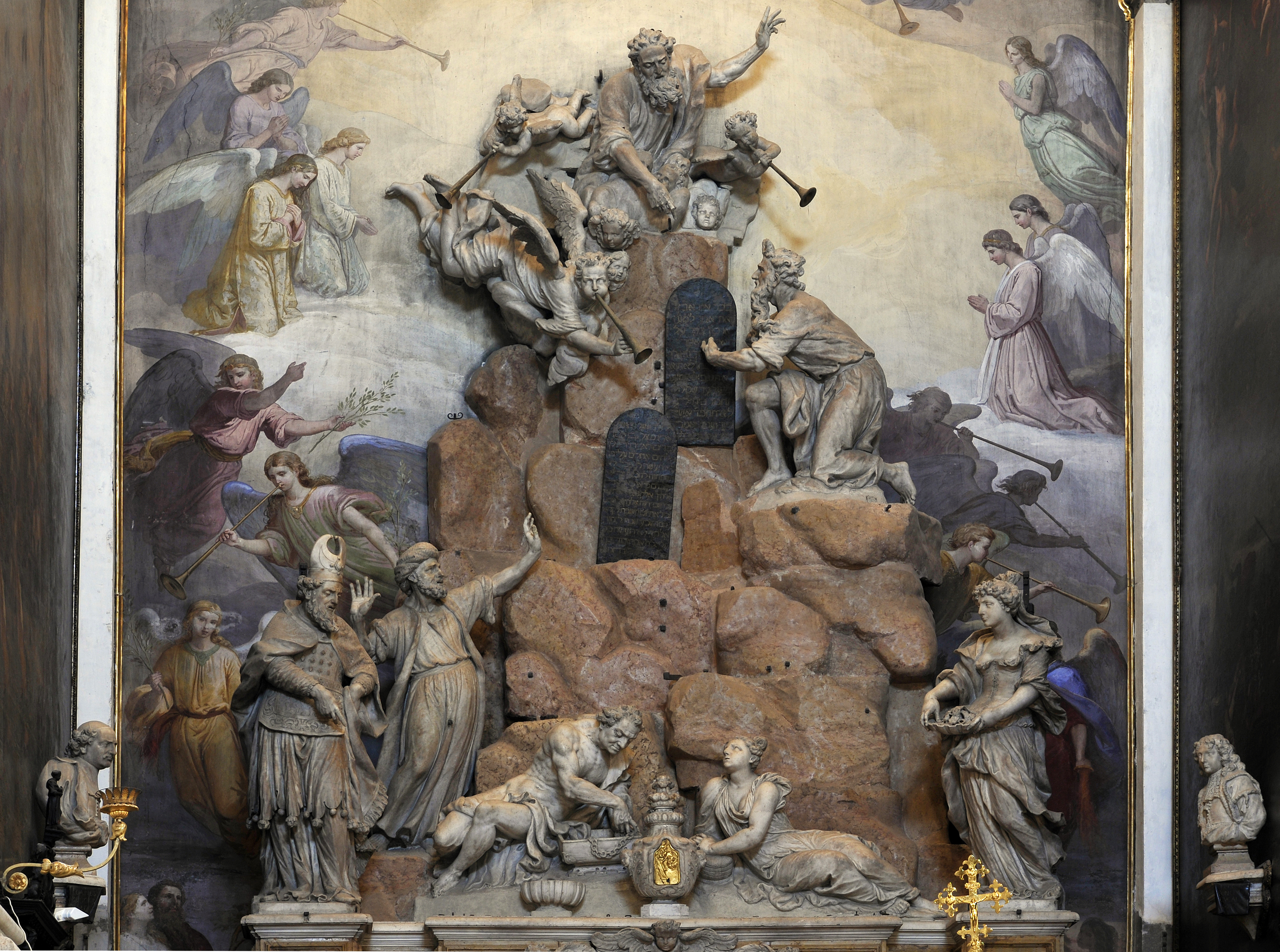
San Moisè, background angels by Morlaiter

== Other works ==
- Church of San Michele Arcangelo in Candiana, ceiling frescoes.
- Parochial church of Biancade in Roncade, altarpiece of Virgin and child with Saints Simon and Giuda.
- Palazzolo sull'Oglio, in Parrocchial Church, Coronation of the Virgin.
