= St. Raphael the Archangel Church (Montreal) =

Former Roman Catholic parish in Canada

Religion
- Affiliation: Roman Catholic
- Ecclesiastical or organisational status: Church

Location
- Location: Montreal, Quebec, Canada
- Interactive map of St. Raphael the Archangel Church
- Coordinates: 45.51235°N 73.61918°W

Architecture
- Completed: 1932

St. Raphael the Archangel is a former Roman Catholic parish in the Outremont neighbourhood of Montreal, Quebec, Canada. It was founded in 1930 for the English-speaking Catholic community of Outremont under the Archdiocese of Montreal. In 1932, the parish built a small Gothic Revival parish church with the same name.

By 2008, after more than 75 years in existence, the parish was forced to close due to the decline in the English-speaking population in the area. It was the last English-speaking Catholic parish in Outremont.

As of 2014, a group is planning to convert the church into a palliative care facility.
