= Heinrich Meyring =

German sculptor

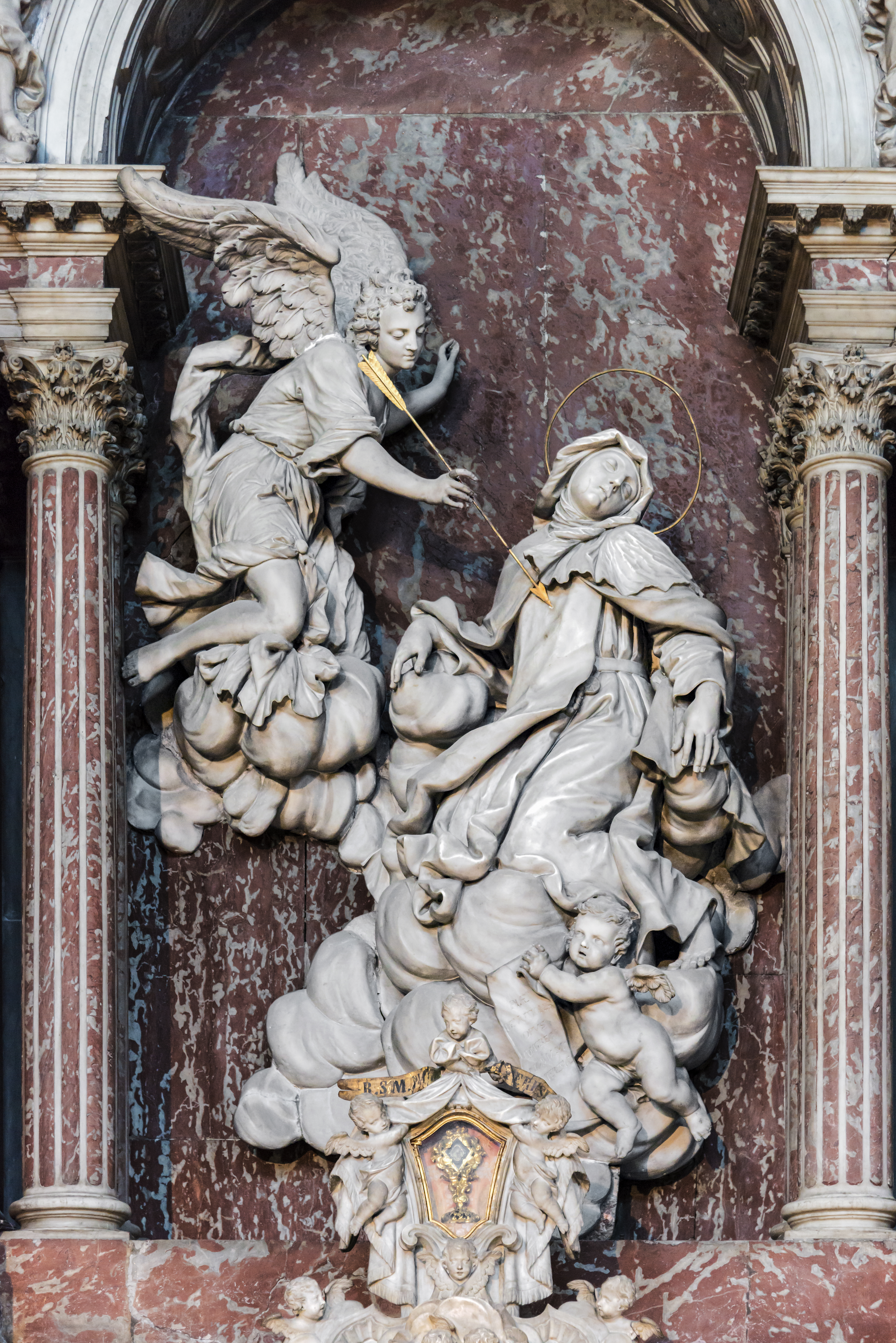
Ecstasy of St. Teresa by Heinrich Meyring (1697), Church of the Scalzi

Heinrich Meyring/ Heinrich Meiering (1628 – 11 February 1723) was a German sculptor, active mainly in Venice and the Veneto. He is also known as Enrico Merengo or Arrigo Merengo.

Meyring was born in Rheine, Westphalia. He is considered one of the main pupils of the Flemish sculptor (active in Venice) Josse de Corte (or Giusto Le Court). Meyring appears to be active in Venice from 1679 to 1714.

The statues of Annunciation in Santa Maria del Giglio are by Meyring.

== Sources ==
- Dissertation by Silvia Wolff
