= Marcantonio Barbaro =

Italian diplomat

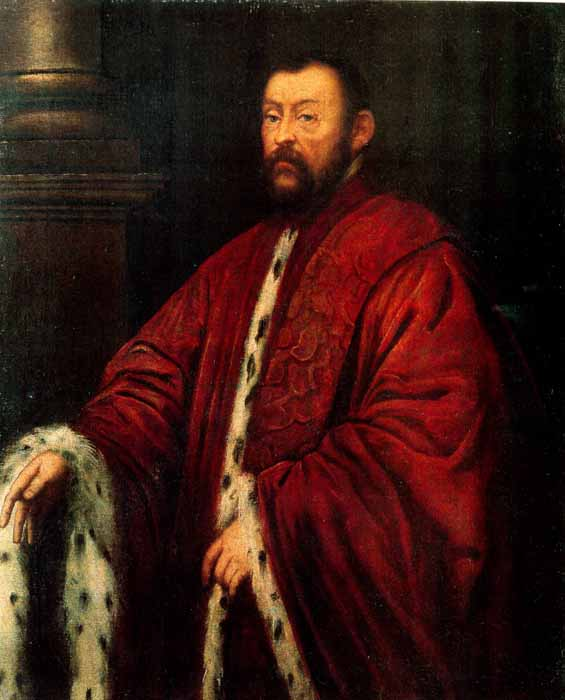
Marcantonio Barbaro depicted by Tintoretto.

Marcantonio Barbaro (1518–1595) was a diplomat of the Republic of Venice.

== Family ==
He was born in Venice into the aristocratic Barbaro family. His father was Francesco di Daniele Barbaro and his mother Elena Pisani, daughter of the banker Alvise Pisani and Cecilia Giustinian.

Barbaro married Giustina Giustiniani in 1534 and they had four sons, one of which, Francesco, became Patriarch of Aquileia, and another, Alvise, married a daughter of Jacopo Foscarini.

On the death of Francesco Barbaro, Marcantonio and his elder brother Daniele Barbaro jointly inherited a country estate at Maser. There was already a house on the estate, but the brothers replaced it with a new house designed for them by the architect Palladio; this Villa Barbaro is now preserved as part of the World Heritage Site "City of Vicenza and the Palladian Villas of the Veneto". The brothers probably had some input in the design of the building. Daniele was a published author whose interests included architecture. Marcantonio Barbaro was an amateur sculptor, and seems to have focused mainly on the garden of the new house (in particular, a water feature, the nymphaeum).

Towards the end of Palladio's life, Marcantonio commissioned him to design a circular chapel, the Tempietto, to serve the Maser estate, and he personally supervised its construction. However, Marcantonio was not buried at Maser, but rather in the family chapel in San Francesco della Vigna in Venice.

== Career and interests ==
Marcantonio was educated at the University of Padua. In the 1590s he was to return to the university as its Rector. Galileo was teaching there at the same time.

In 1560, he held the office of Savio di Terraferma. He served as ambassador to France from 1561-64. and later served as bailo of Constantinople, i.e. ambassador to the Sublime Porte (Ottoman Empire) from 1568–73 and again in 1574. Barbaro negotiated a peace treaty in the aftermath of his country's loss of Cyprus in 1571 and the Battle of Lepanto later the same year. Two years after the Christian victory in the Battle of Lepanto he described how the Ottoman state was run by Christians who had converted to Islam: "It is a matter deserving consideration that the wealth, strength and government, in short the entire state of the Ottoman Empire be based and put into the hands of all people all born in Christ's faith, who by different means have been made slaves and transferred to the Mohammedan sect."

In 1583, he was instructed by the Senate to map the Friulan frontier to avoid border disputes. In 1593 he was finally authorized to begin fortification of the area. He was involved in the development of the fortress town of Palmanova. Barbaro was a candidate for Doge of Venice in 1570, 1578, 1585, and 1595.

Barbaro used his position as a senator to influence public architecture in Venice. In 1558 he and his brother Daniele supported Palladio's design for a new façade for the Cathedral of San Pietro di Castello. Palladio’s project for rebuilding the Doge's Palace after a fire was rejected despite Barbaro's support. However, Palladio’s design for the church of the Redentore was approved by the senate.

After Palladio’s death, Barbaro transferred his support to Vincenzo Scamozzi. In 1587 he supported Scamozzi's design for a triple-arched Rialto Bridge, though Antonio da Ponte’s design for a single-arched bridge was chosen instead, and was one of three Venetian noblemen appointed to oversee the rebuilding of the bridge.

Marcantonio was an early pioneer of Jewish rights within the Republic of Venice. He played an instrumental role in acceptance of Solomon of Udine, Turkish ambassador to Venice, at the Doge's Palace.
