= Antonio Barbaro =

Italian military leader

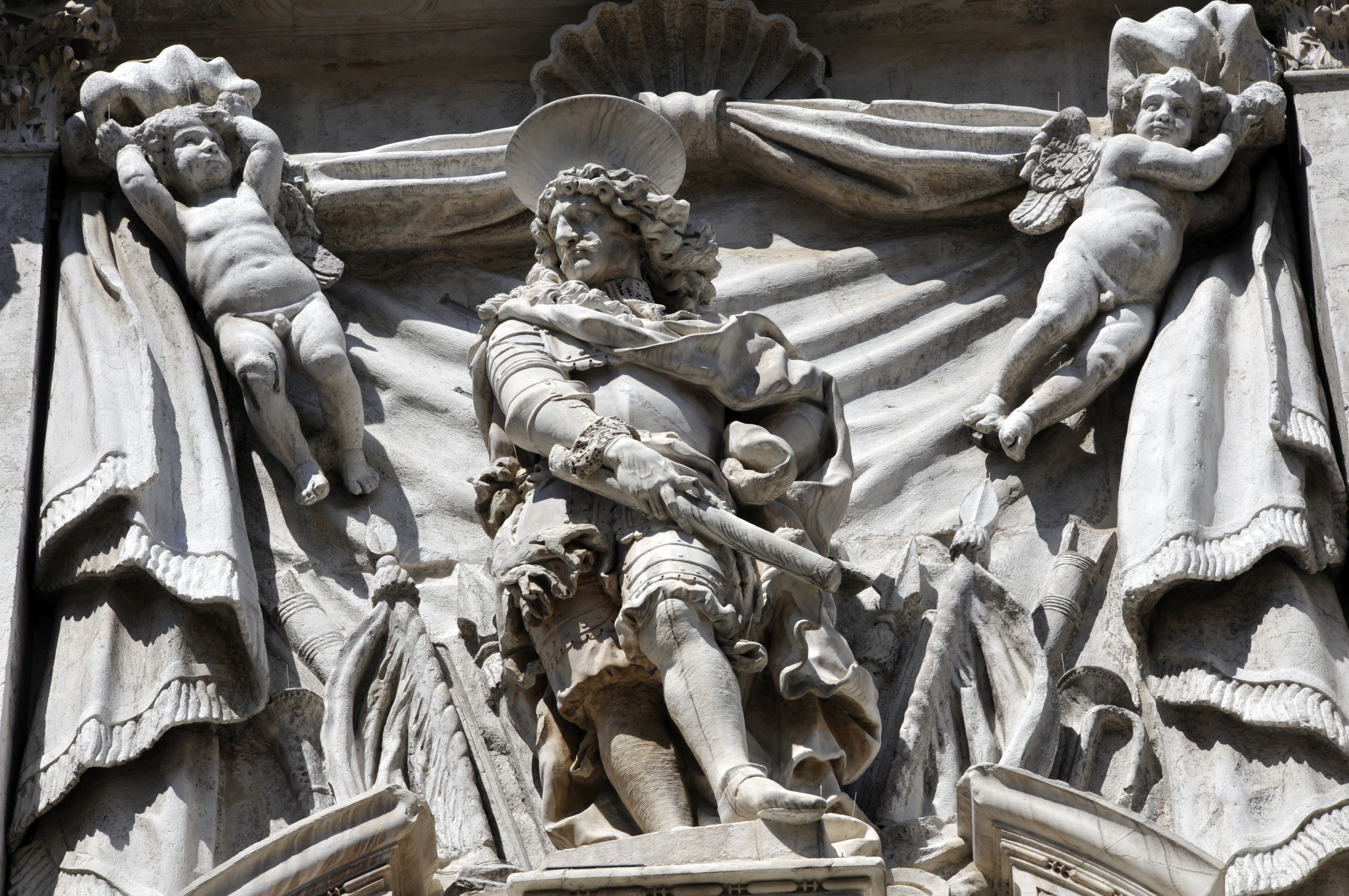

Provveditore generale of Dalmatia
- In office January 1670 – July 1671
- Preceded by: Antonio Priuli
- Succeeded by: Giambattista Nani as procuratore commissario, Giorgio Morosini

Personal details
- Died: 1679
- Occupation: Politician

Antonio Barbaro (1627–1678), son of Marc'Antonio, was a Venetian general and governor, a member of the patrician Barbaro family of Venice (now Italy), who held positions in Crete, Dalmatia and Rome. Barbaro lived at a time when Venice had a maritime empire in the Mediterranean.

Barbaro served in Candia (now Heraklion), Crete during the long-lasting Siege of Candia. He was Captain of the Gulf from 1655 to 1656, and in 1667 he became Provveditore generale di Candia.

Barbaro also served in the Balkans; from 1670 he became the provveditore generale of Venetian Dalmatia and Venetian Albania. He was Provveditore general of Zara from 1670 to 1672.

Antonio Barbaro was Podesta of Padua in 1672. In 1676 he served as an ambassador to Rome. He also served as Proveditor general of an army against the Uscocchi, Captain in the Battle of the Dardanelles, and conquered Zara.

== Legacy ==
When Barbaro died in 1678, he left 30,000 ducats for the rebuilding of the church of Santa Maria Zobenigo, also known as the Santa Maria de Giglio, in Venice. This was done according precise specifications listed in an attachment to Barbaro's will, which also notes that the church is in a good position 'to speak directly to Ca' Morosini'.

The church was originally built around 900 by the Zubenigo family, who died out in 1124. It was rebuilt in a Baroque style by Giuseppe Sardi between 1678 and 1680.

The façade shows has bas-reliefs with plans for the cities Rome, Corfu, Padua, Candia, Spalatro, and Pavia; all places where Barbaro or his brothers held civil or military appointments. Another series of bas-reliefs above the first portray the six naval battles in which the brothers participated. These maps predate the official Venetian cartographic commission of Vincenzo Coronelli by almost a decade.

A statue of Antonio Barbaro is in the middle of the façade. It was damaged by lightning in 1759. Statues of Antonio Barbaro's four brothers flank his, two on each side. . Other statues portray allegorical figures of Hunger, Honor, Virtue, and Wisdom. All of the statues are probably the work of Josse de Corte. The Barbaro coat of arms, as well as the four cardinal virtues are also depicted.

There are no Christian symbols on the façade. John Ruskin condemned the façade as “a manifestation of insolent atheism”. and thought that the poverty of the last members of the Barbaro family was justice for the family having rebuilt the Church as a monument to themselves.

Barbaro was praised by Gabriele d'Annunzio during his declaration in Zara in 1918.

== Bibliography ==
- Decisione degli auditori nuovi alle sentenze di Venezia. 1693 maggio 28, Venezia Decisione di Antonio Barbaro, Benedetto Zorzi ed Alvise Gritti, auditori nuovi alle sentenze di Venezia sulla sentenza emessa da Alvise Priuli, capitano di Bergamo, a favore del marchese Gaspare Giacinto Martinengo fu Gherardo e contro la comunità di Calcinate, per l'elezione a canevaro, camparo e tesoriere del comune.
- Michaela Marangoni: Una famiglia veneziana nella storia: i Barbaro; atte del Convegno di Studi in Occasione del Quinto Centenario della Morte dell'Umanista Ermolao; Venezia, 4 - 6 novembre 1993. Venezia, 1996 ISBN 88-86166-34-6
- A. Miculian: Copia dei Capitoli già stabiliti dall’ Ill. mo et ecc. mo Sig.r Antonio Barbaro Prov.re Gnal in Dalmatia, et Albania per gl’Haiduci
