= Santa Maria Zobenigo =

Church in Venice, Italy

Church of Santa Maria Zobenigo
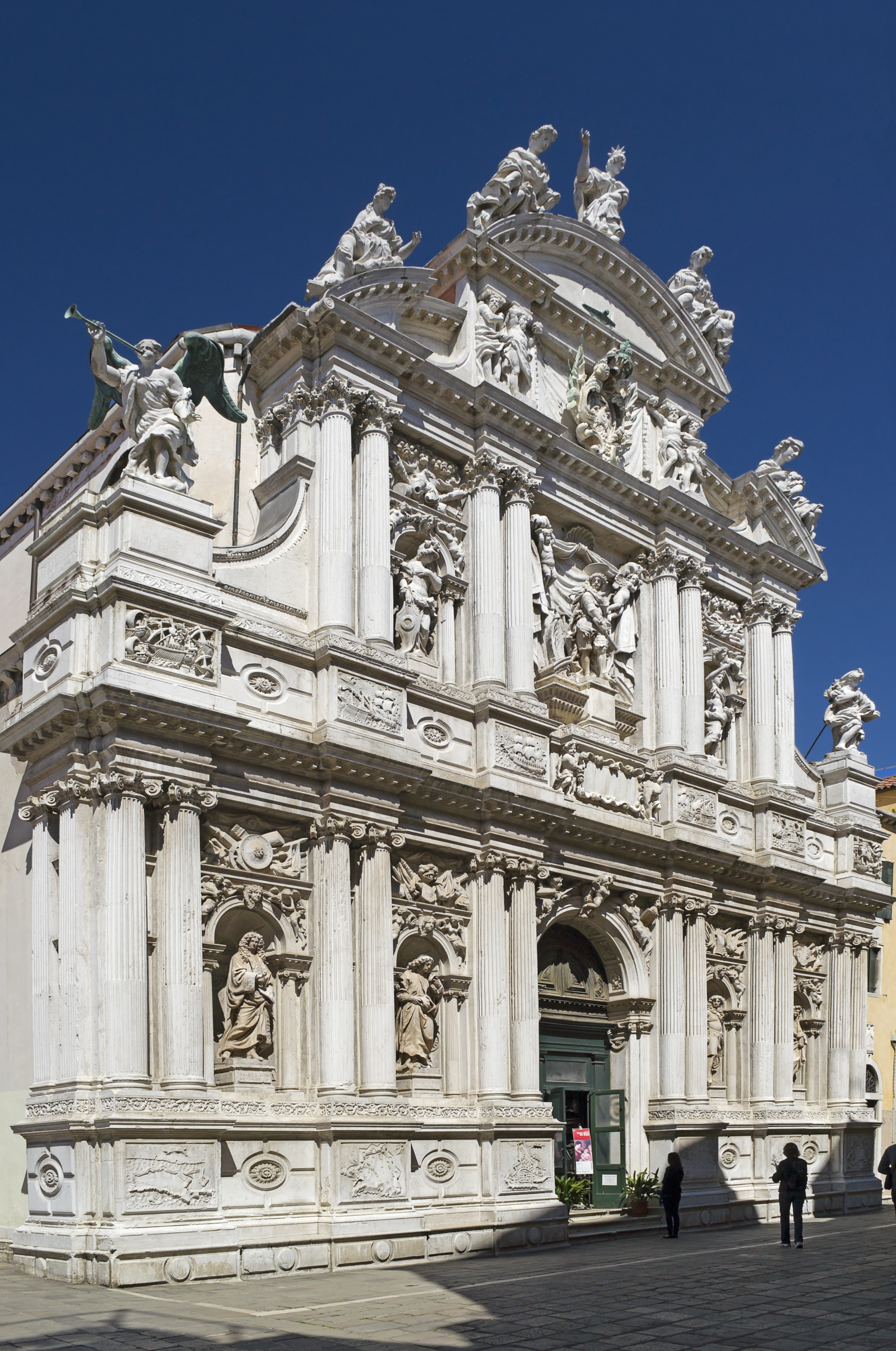
- Also known as Santa Maria del Giglio

- Location within Venice Location within Italy

Religion
- Affiliation: Roman Catholic
- Province: Venice

Location
- Location: Venice, Italy
- Coordinates: 45°25′57″N 12°19′58″E

Architecture
- Architect: Giuseppe Sardi
- Type: Church
- Style: Baroque
- Completed: 1681

The Chiesa di Santa Maria del Giglio is a church in Venice, Italy.

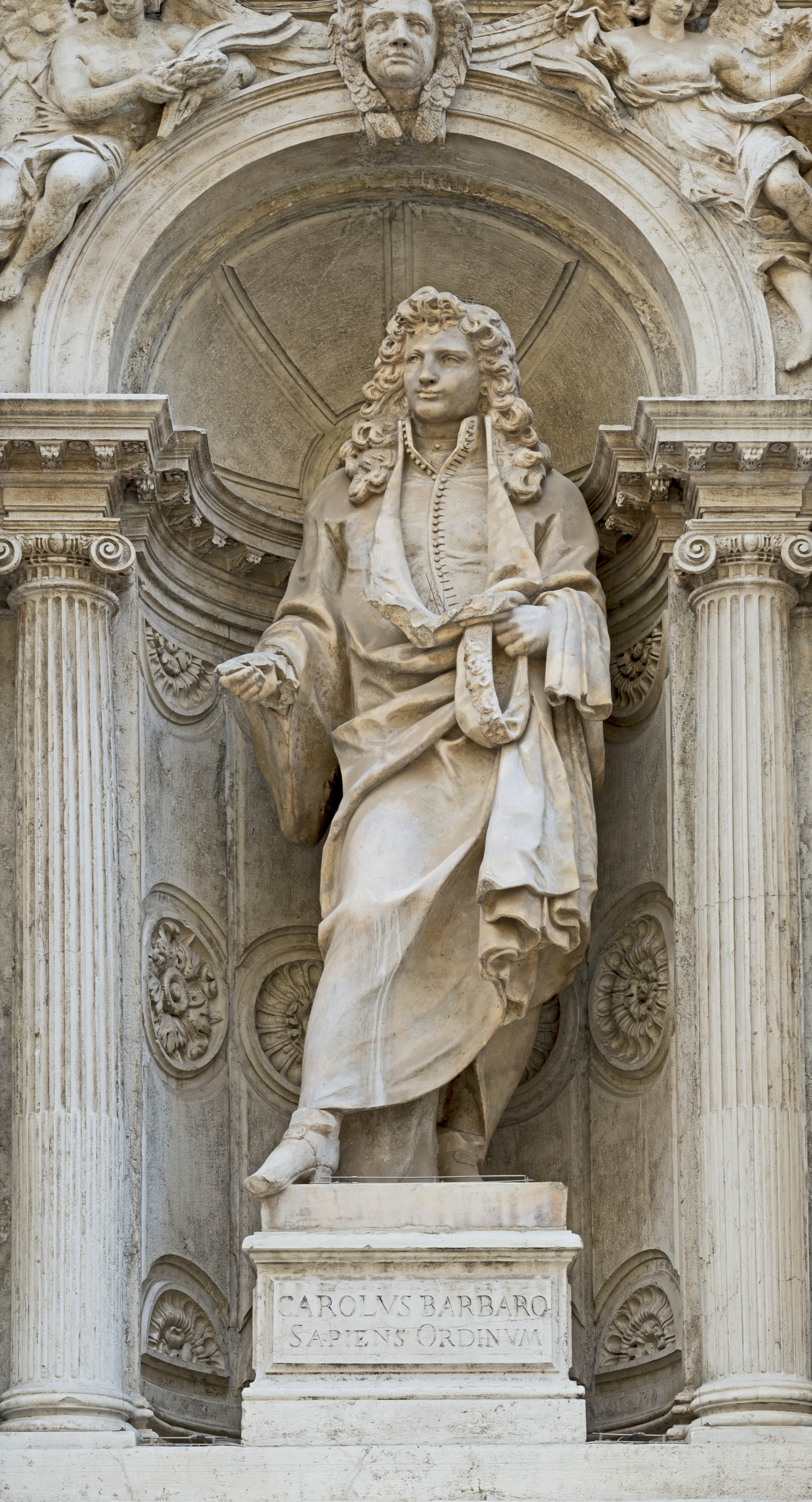
Statue of Carolus Barbaro.

The church, whose name translates into St. Mary of the Lily referring to the flower classically depicted as being presented by the Angel Gabriel during the Annunciation), is more commonly known as Santa Maria Zobenigo after the Jubanico family who founded it in the 9th century. The edifice is situated on the Campo Santa Maria Zobenigo, west of the Piazza San Marco. It was rebuilt by Giuseppe Sardi for Admiral Antonio Barbaro between 1678 and 1681 and has one of the finest Venetian Baroque facades in all of Venice. The church is now part of the parish of San Moisè.

== Exterior ==
The exterior lacks any Christian image statues or reliefs. It shows the marble relief maps of various places in which Antonio Barbaro served, including Candia, Zadar, Padua, Rome, Corfu and Split. His own statue, as the chief benefactor, in the center, sculpted by Josse de Corte, is flanked by representations of Honour, Virtue, Fame and Wisdom. The other statues are his brothers. At the top of the facade is the Barbaro family arms carved in relief.

== Interior ==
The nave ceiling is decorated with a large canvas by Antonio Zanchi. Along the nave are painted depictions of the Via Crucis (1755–1756) or Stations of the Cross by various artists, including Francesco Zugno, Gianbattista Crosato, Gaspare Diziani, and Jacopo Marieschi. To the right of the nave entering, the Molin chapel contains a Madonna and Child with Young St John, the only painting by the Flemish painter Rubens in Venice. That chapel also has a painting of St Vincent Ferrer (1750) by Giovanni Battista Piazzetta and Giuseppe Angeli.

The altar has flanking statues depicting the Annuciation by Heinrich Meyring. Behind the high altar, in the sanctuary are paintings of the Evangelists by Jacopo Tintoretto. The organ shutters include works by Alessandro Vittoria. Other paintings in the church are by Sebastiano Ricci and Palma the Younger. Giovanni Maria Morlaiter has an additional sculpture found in the second chapel to the right of San Gregorio Barbarigo. Another painting by Tintoretto, Christ with two Saints in the north aisle, has been damaged by restoration.

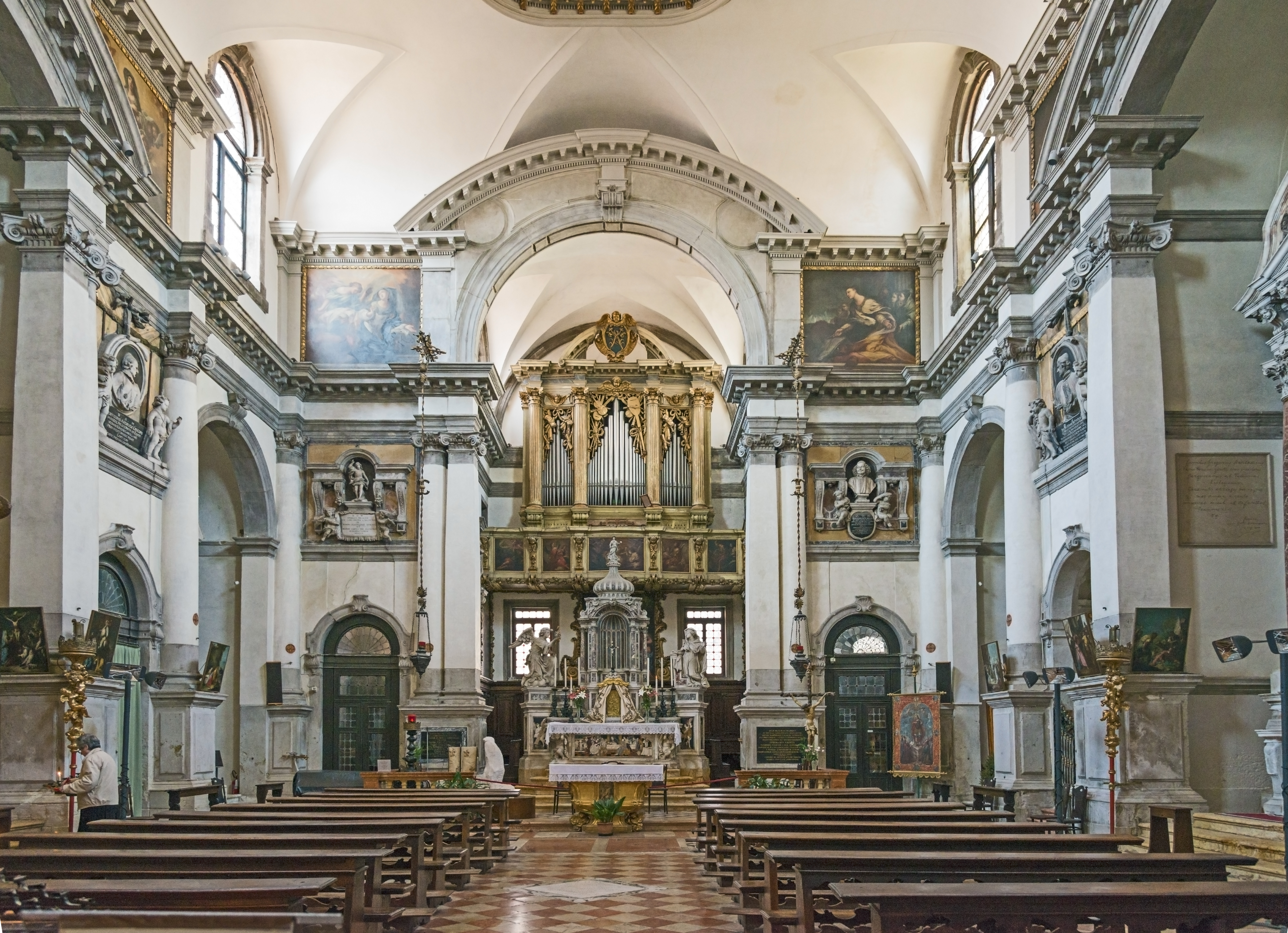
Interior view.

== In fiction ==
The church and its parish feature in the novel Jonathan Strange and Mr Norrell by Susanna Clarke; The titular Mr. Strange stays in a house near Santa Maria Zobenigo when he is cursed causing perpetual night to descend on the parish. The church is mentioned in chapter IX, page 77 of Ernest Hemingway's 1950 novel, Across the River and Into the Trees. Part of the action in Nicolas Remin's novel Venezianische Verlobung takes place in Santa Maria Zobenigo. The Church is mentioned in Those Who Walk Away by Patricia Highsmith, which is set in Venice.
