= Donato Barbaro =

Donato Barbaro was responsible for the Venetian victory over the Paleologo in 1259.
