= Maser, Veneto =

Maser
- Comune
- Comune di Maser
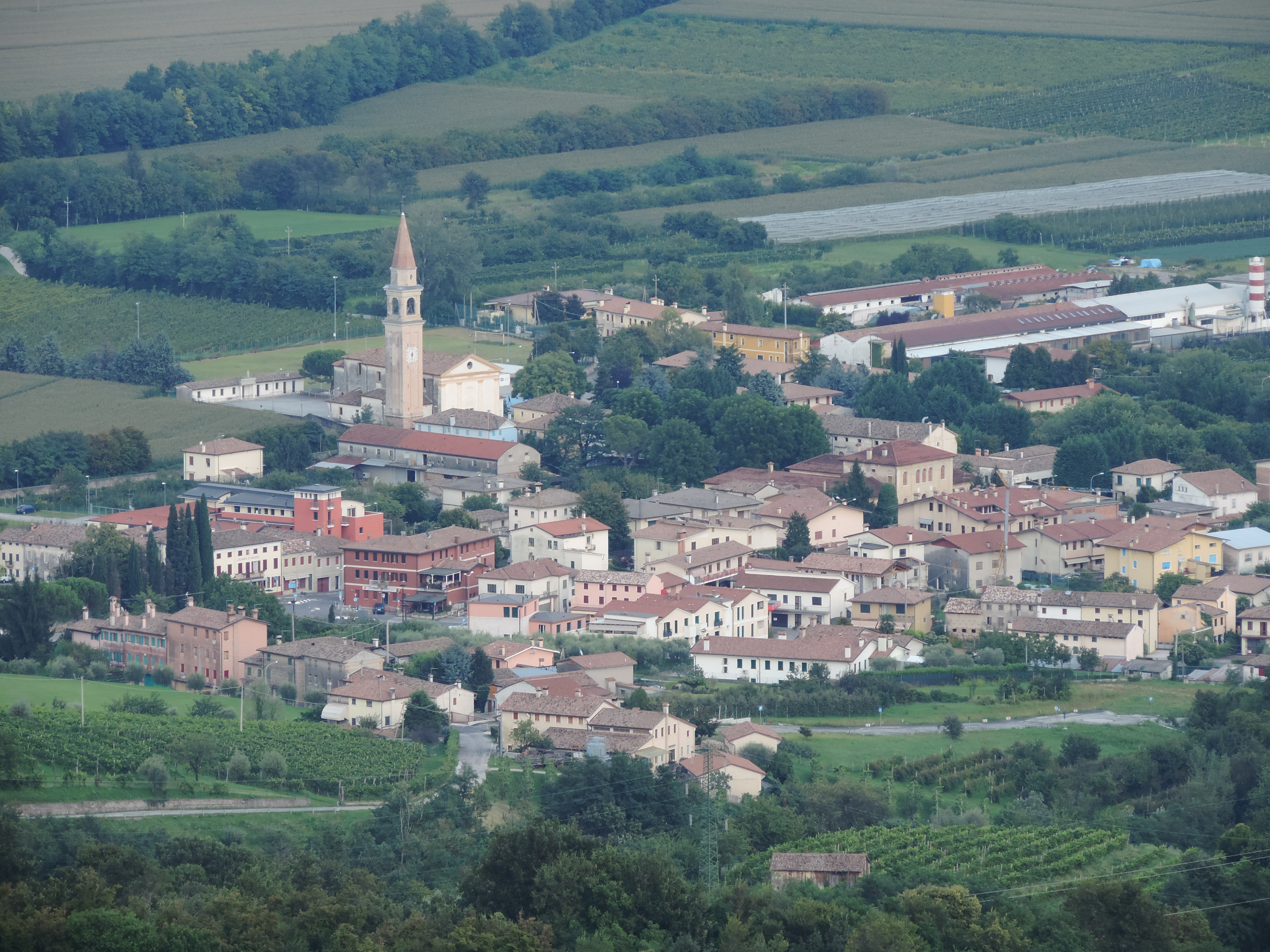
- Maser

- Location within Italy Location within Veneto
- Coordinates: 45°49′N 11°59′E
- Country: Italy
- Region: Veneto
- Province: Province of Treviso (TV)
- Frazioni: Coste, Crespignaga, Madonna della Salute

Area
  - Total: 26.0 km^{2} (10.0 sq mi)

Population (Dec. 2021)
  - Total: 5,125
  - Density: 197/km^{2} (511/sq mi)
- Time zone: UTC+1 (CET)
  - Summer (DST): UTC+2 (CEST)
- Postal code: 31010
- Dialing code: 0423
- Website: Official website

Maser (Mazer) is a comune (municipality) in the Province of Treviso in the Italian region Veneto, located about 50 kilometres (31 mi) northwest of Venice and about 25 kilometres (16 mi) northwest of Treviso. As of 31 December 2004, it had a population of 4,854 and an area of 26.0 square kilometres (10.0 mi^{2}).

The municipality of Maser contains the frazioni (subdivisions, mainly villages and hamlets) Coste, Crespignaga, and Madonna della Salute.

Maser borders the following municipalities: Altivole, Asolo, Caerano di San Marco, Cornuda, Monfumo.

== Monuments and places of interest ==
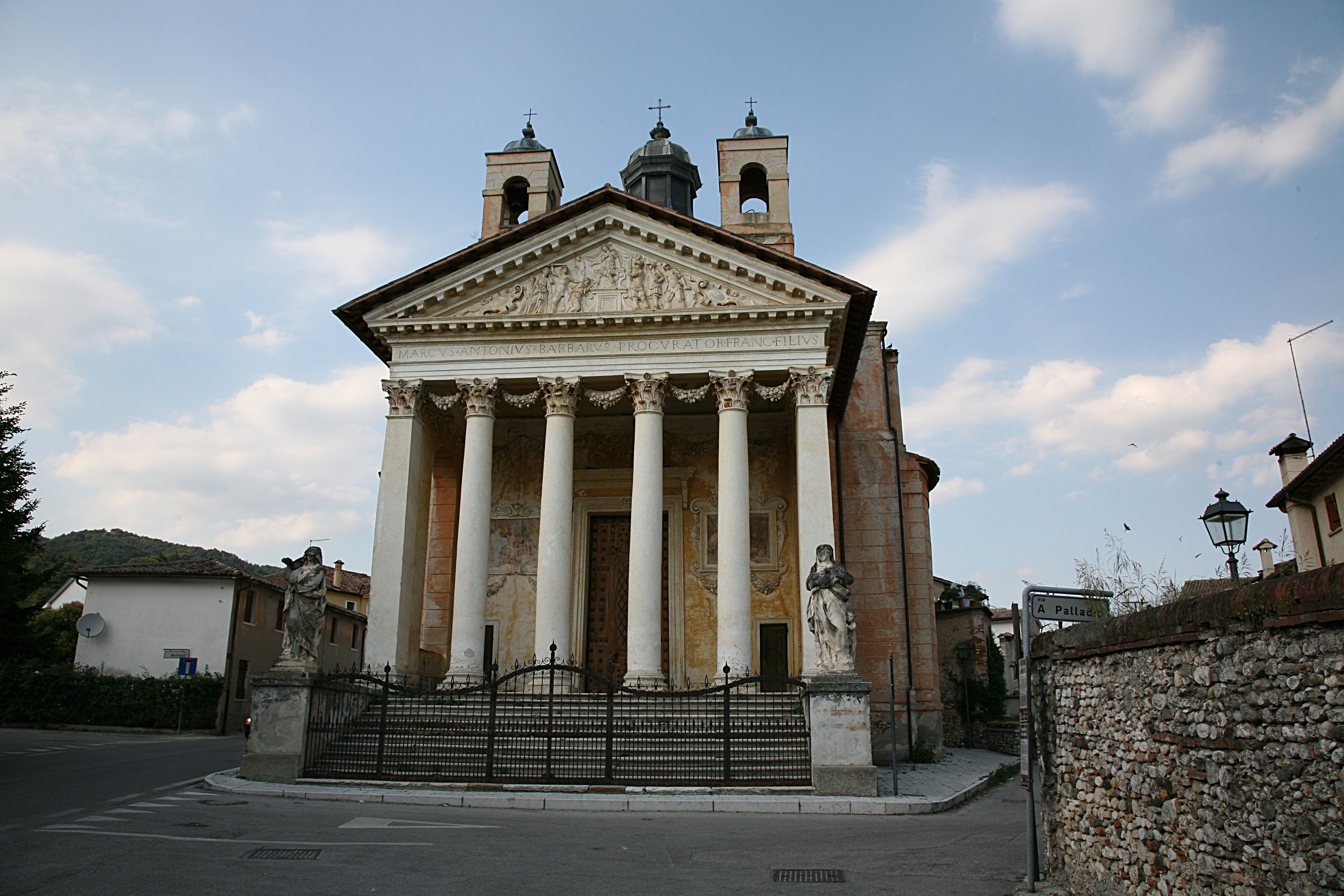
Tempietto Villa Barbaro

=== Venetian Villas ===
The following is a list of some Venetian villas in the municipality of Maser:.

The municipality is notable for being the place of death of the architect Andrea Palladio, creator of the famous Palladian style of architecture.

- Villa Barbaro in Maser is one of his finest projects and towards the end of his life, Palladio received the opportunity to build a church, the Tempietto Barbaro, to serve the Villa Barbaro and the village of Maser.
- Villa Fabris (Maser)
- Villa Nani, Trieste, Fanzago
- Villa Querini
- Ca' Pesaro Facchinetti Vettoretto

== Demographic evolution ==
Historical population

Year	Pop.	±%
1861	?	—
1871	2,936	—
1881	3,199	+9.0%
1901	3,402	+6.3%
1911	4,013	+18.0%
1921	4,374	+9.0%

Year	Pop.	±%
1931	4,104	−6.2%
1936	4,081	−0.6%
1951	4,637	+13.6%
1961	4,239	−8.6%
1971	4,377	+3.3%
1981	4,616	+5.5%

Year	Pop.	±%
1991	4,730	+2.5%
2001	4,846	+2.5%
2011	4,964	+2.4%
2021	5,125	+3.2%

Source: Data from ISTAT

=== Foreign ethnicities and minorities ===
As of December 31, 2022, foreigners residents in the municipality were 324, i.e. 6.4% of the population. The largest groups are shown below:

1. Romania 113
2. China 46
3. Morocco 38
4. Albania 33
5. North Macedonia 28
