= Palazzo da Lezze, Venice =

Palazzo da Lezze
- Palazzo da Lezze (Spanish)
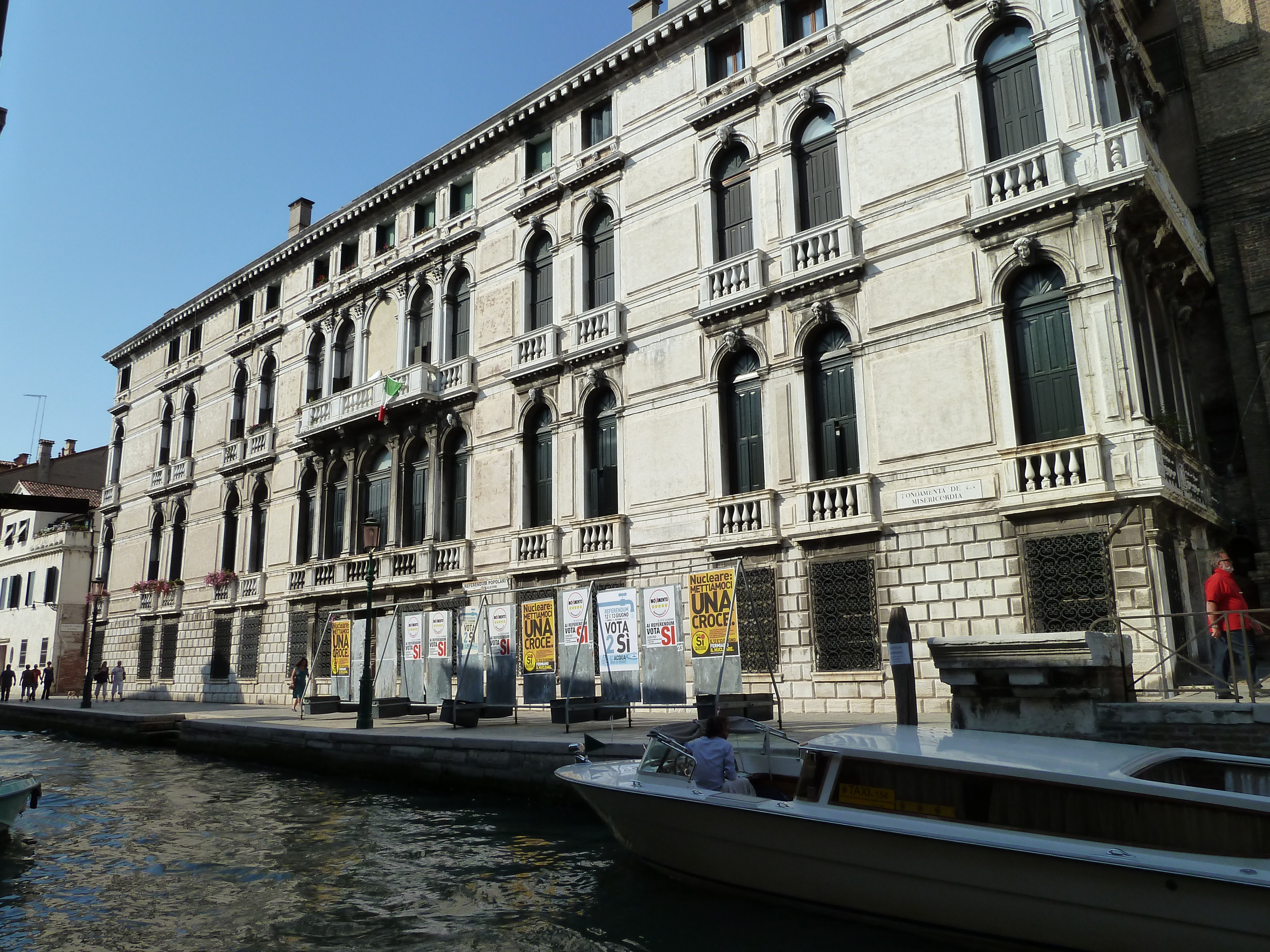
- Facade.

- Location within Venice Palazzo da Lezze, Venice (Italy)

General information
- Architectural style: Baroque
- Location: Venice
- Coordinates: 45°26′36.47″N 12°20′02.41″E

The Palazzo da Lezze or Ca' Lezze is a Baroque palace in Sestiere of Cannaregio in the city of Venice, Italy. It is located on Rio della Misericordia, with a facade on the fondamenta (canal-sidewalk), and stands between the Scuola Grande Nuova della Misericordia and Calle Largo Lezze.

== History ==
While Baldassare Longhena was said to have been the architect, the main part of the facade (1611-1617) was commissioned Giovanni da Lezze di Andrea (1554-1625), who served as Procurator of Saint Mark. The ground floor has ashlar masonry and the upper floors are heavy with balustraded balconies, similar to those seen in the Palazzo Pesaro. Thus the contribution of Longhena appears to be the wing and three arch facade facing the campo of the adjacent Scuola, which had a grand entrance and stairwell. Longhena's contribution were said to have occurred in 1654; the architect had served as architect for the family's villa at San Biagio di Callalta.

In Sansovino and Martinoni's 1663 guide to the City of Venice, the palace is described as:

large in circuit, with copious noble rooms, a facade highly ornamented in marble, with most lovely carvings, especially graceful and delicate are in particular the heads of women, placed on window keystones and arches. The internal courtyard, On marble bases placed in the walls, are placed several half statues, busts and heads diligently sculpted by Francesco Cavrioli.

A small casino which served as a garden entrance at Rio della Sensa, across the Rio from the Scuola Vecchia, and adjacent to the Scuola Nuova della Misericordia was also designed by Longhena; it has been recently restructured with modern interiors by Filippo Caprioglio.

The interior decorations once included a storied art collection and a frescoed ceiling by Tiepolo. These were either sold during the 18th century, or destroyed or looted after the fall of the Venetian Republic.

The interior is now divided into apartments.
