= Josse de Corte =

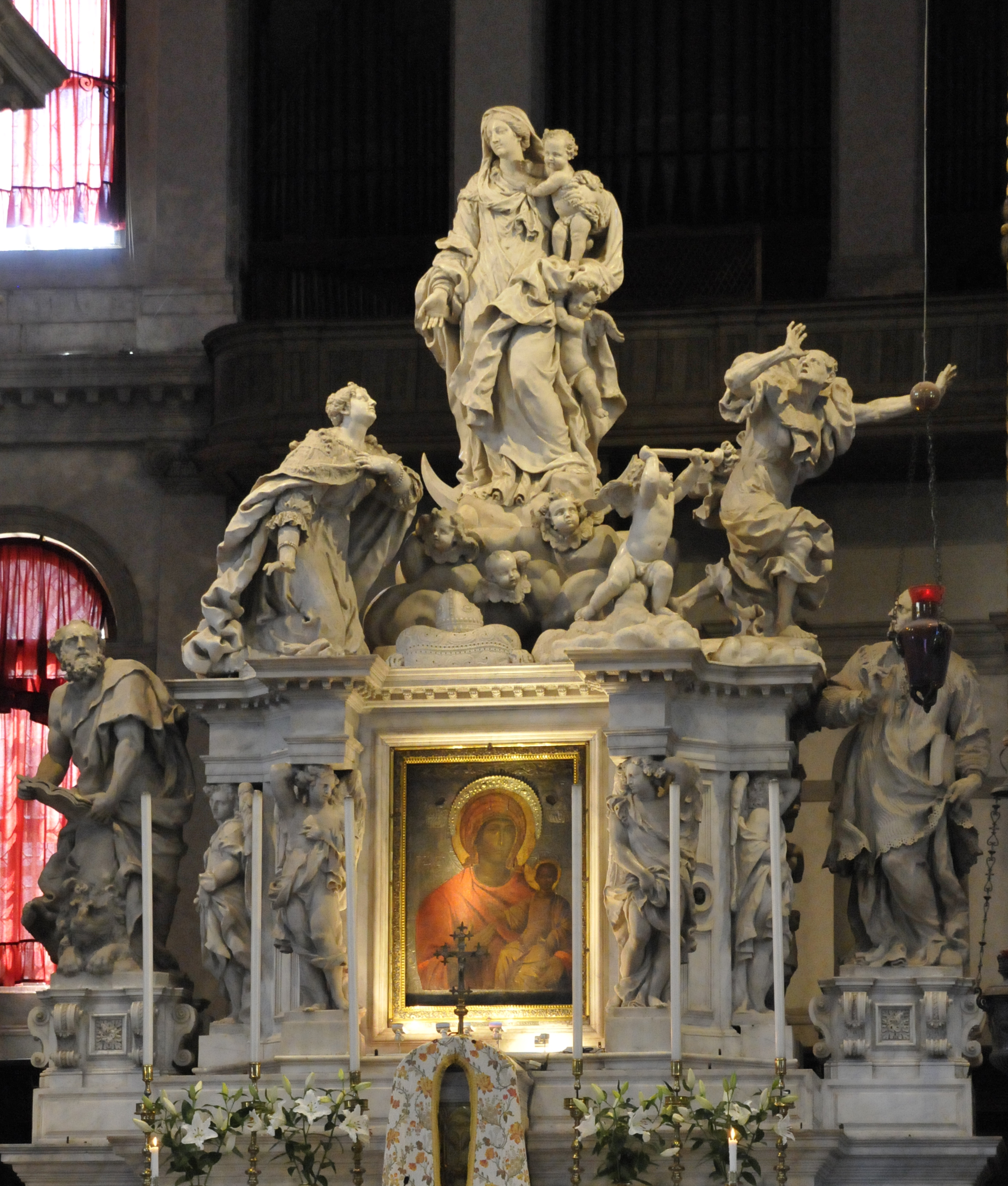
Queen of Heaven Expelling the Plague, main altar, Santa Maria della Salute

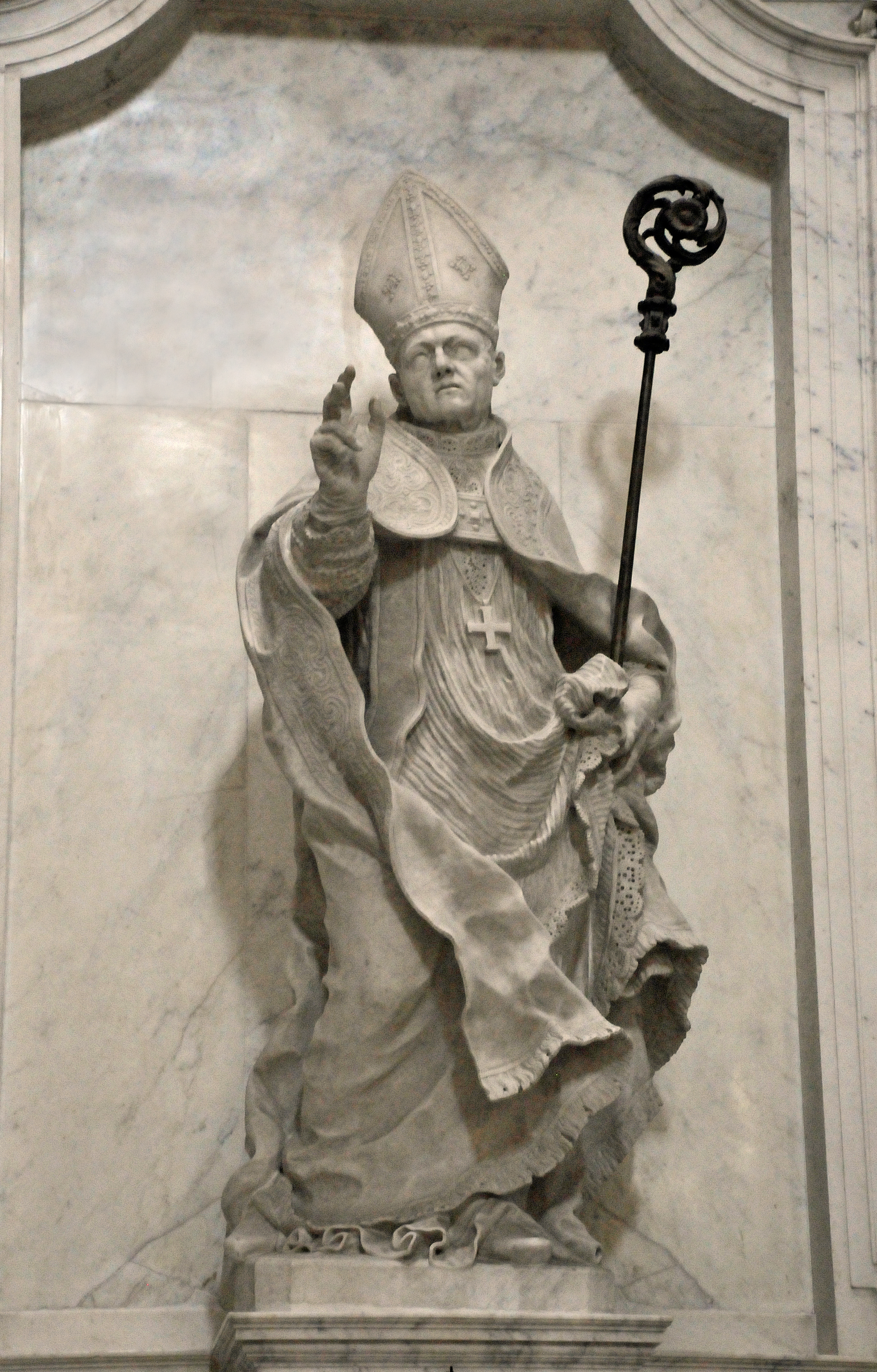
Gerardo Sagredo by Josse de Corte

Josse de Corte (1627–1679) was a Baroque Flemish sculptor, born in Ypres, but mainly active in Venice after 1657.

== History ==
He is also known as Giusto Le Court, Giusto Cort, Josse Lecurt, or Josse Cort. He obtained some training in Rome by François Duquesnoy.

His masterpiece is the theatrical and dynamic high altar sculptural complex Queen of Heaven Expelling the Plague for the church of Santa Maria della Salute in Venice. It depicts the Virgin Mary saving pleading figures and scattering the personified evil of the plague.

He also completed part of the Morosini Monument in San Clemente all'Isola in Venice. He also sculpted the Atlantes on the façade of the church of the Ospedaletto in Venice. Among his pupils in Venice were Heinrich Meyring (Enrico Merengo), Francesco Cavrioli, Francesco Penso, and Orazio Marinali. Together they all contributed, together with Tommaso Rues, to the extensive sculptural decoration of the exterior of Santa Maria della Salute.

Atlantes in the Chiesa dell'Ospedaletto

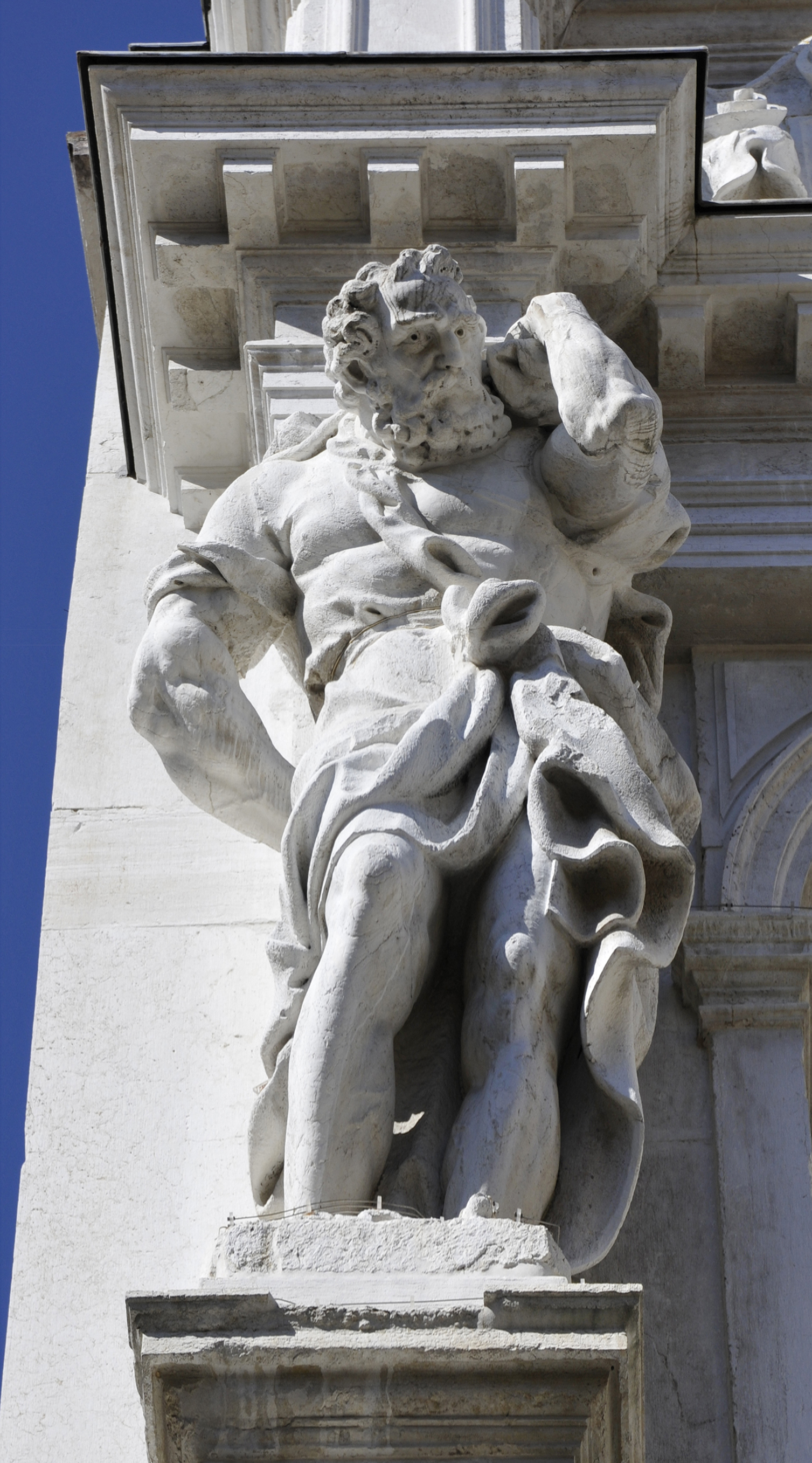

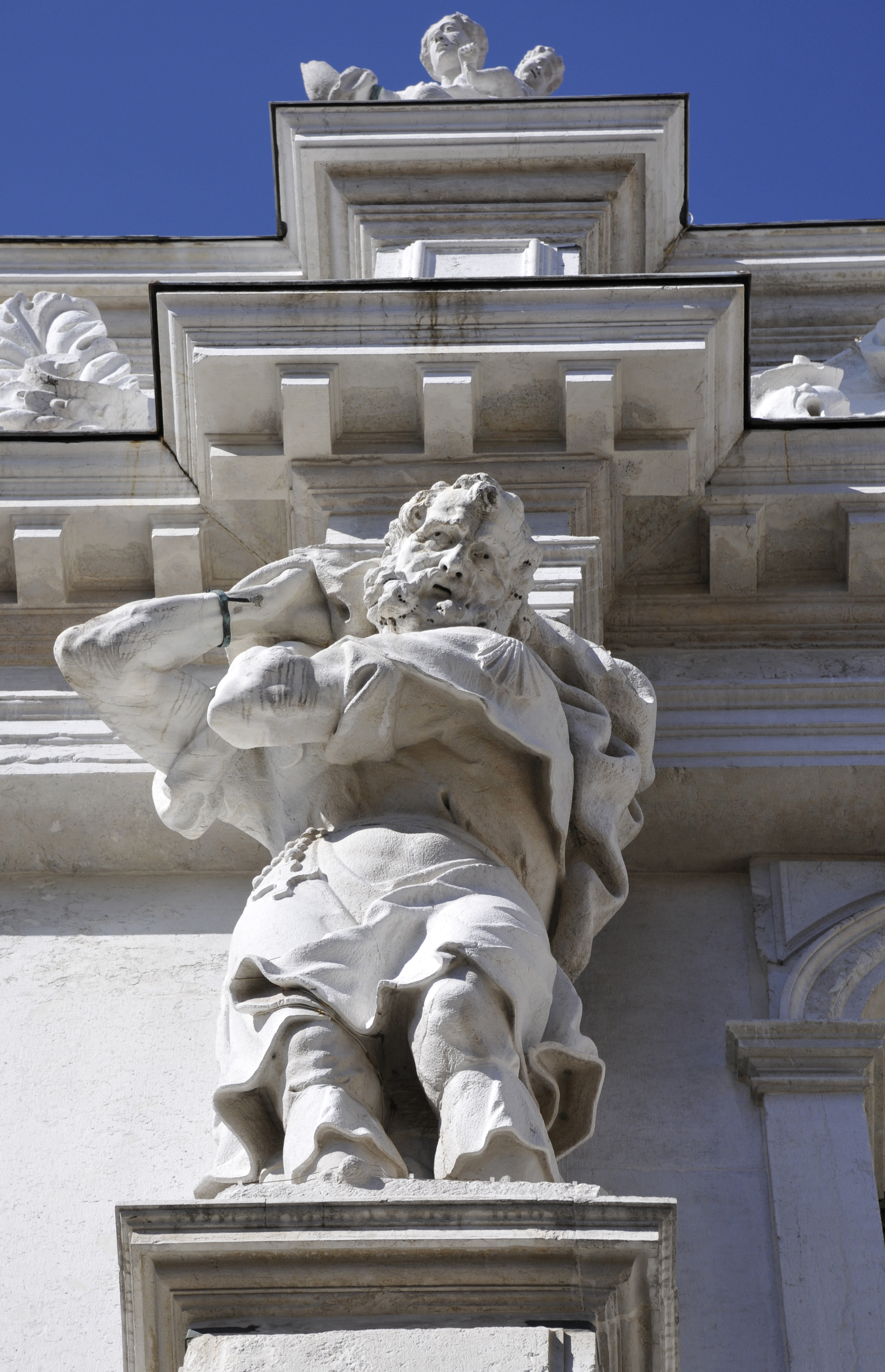

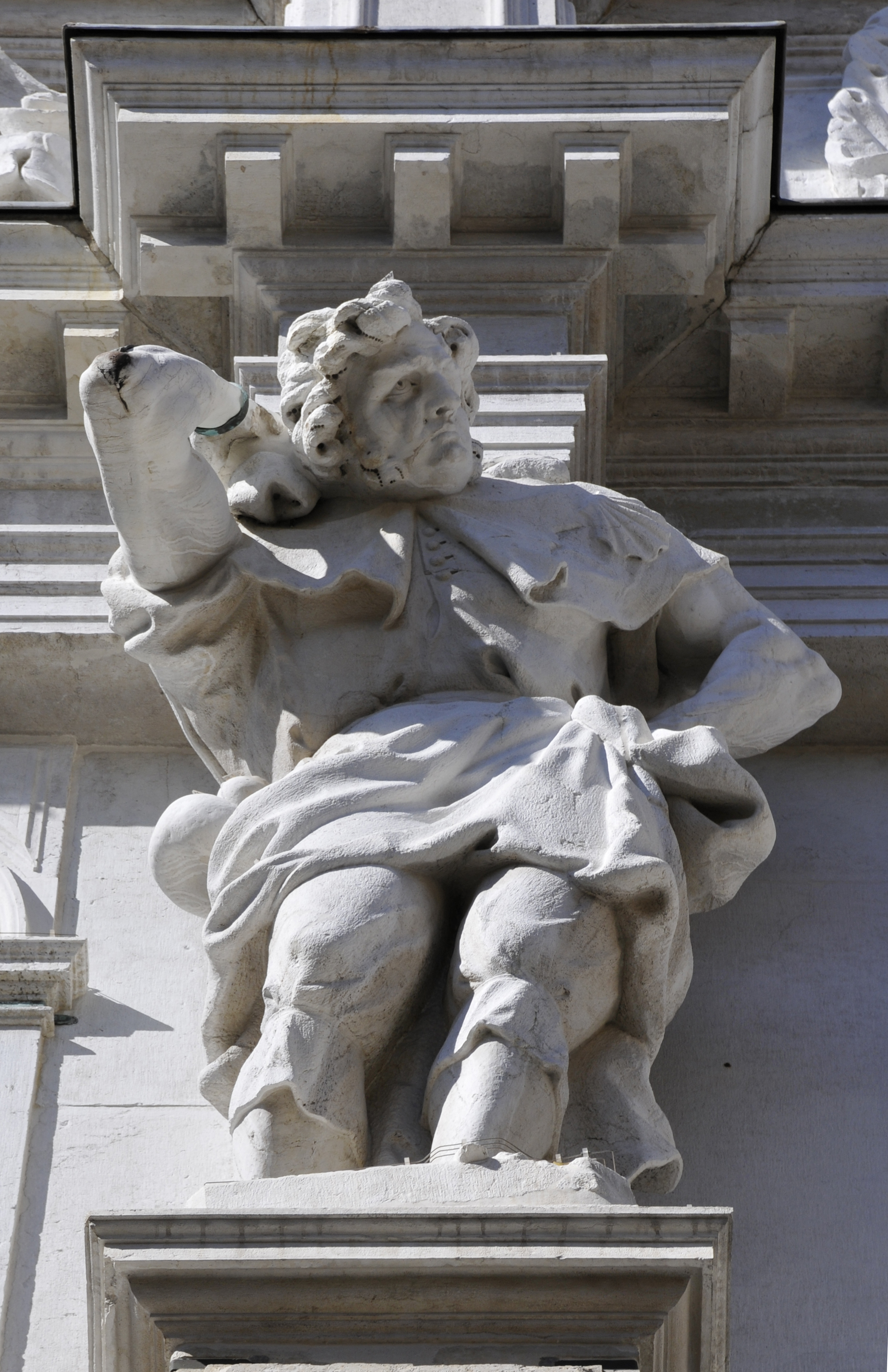

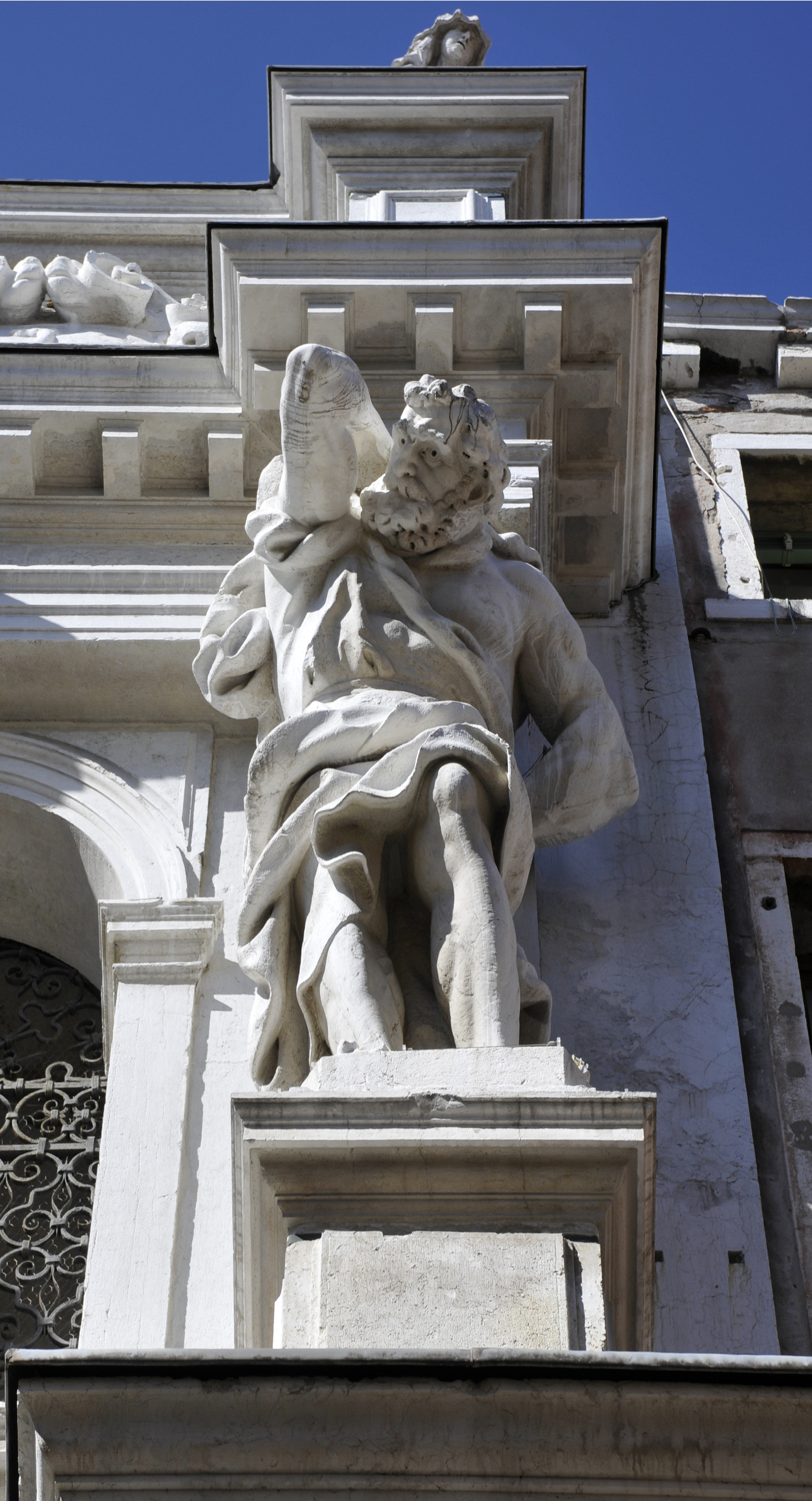
