= Santa Maria dei Derelitti =

Church in Venice, Italy

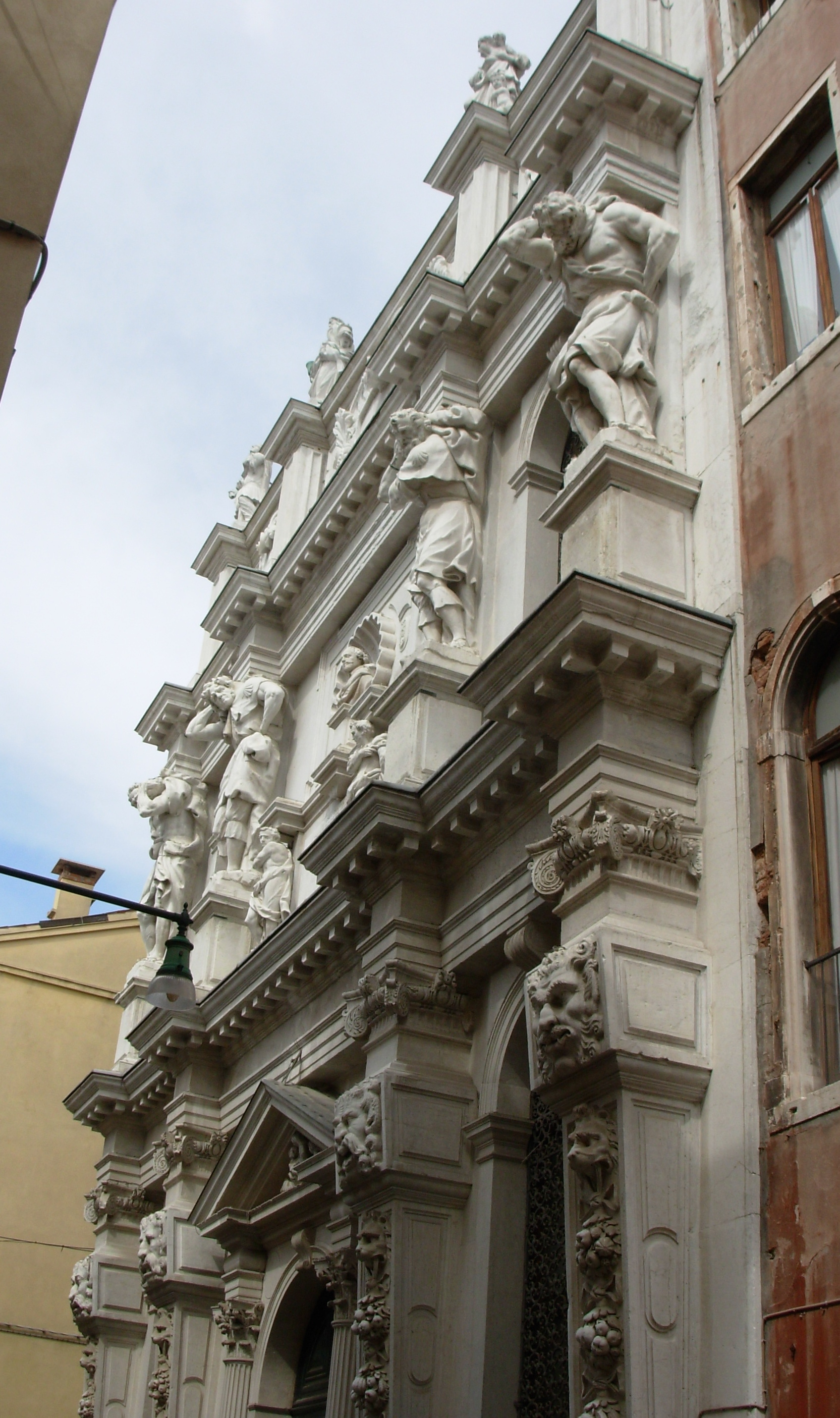

- Location within Venice Location within Italy

Religion
- Affiliation: Roman Catholic
- Province: Venice

Location
- Location: Venice, Italy
- Coordinates: 45.4388°N 12.3428°E

Architecture
- Style: Renaissance
- Completed: 1575

Santa Maria dei Derelitti, commonly known as the church of the Ospedaletto or the Poveri Derelitti, is a Renaissance-style, consecrated church in the Calle della Barbaria delle Tole of the sestiere of Castello, Venice, Italy.

== History ==
The church was begun in 1575 adjacent to a 1528 hospital that cared for the poor and disabled orphans. The design and layout was influenced by Andrea Palladio, but the profusely decorated Baroque facade was completed by Baldassarre Longhena and contains sculptures by Giusto Le Court.

The nave still contains frescoes by Jacopo Guarana and Agostino Mengozzi Colonna (son of Gerolamo), and works by Palma the Younger, Giovanni Battista Tiepolo, Carlos Loth, and Pietro Liberi.

The church until the 19th-century had a choir formed of orphan children, that were housed next door. In 2016, the church is now used for concerts.

Atlantes in the Chiesa dell'Ospedaletto

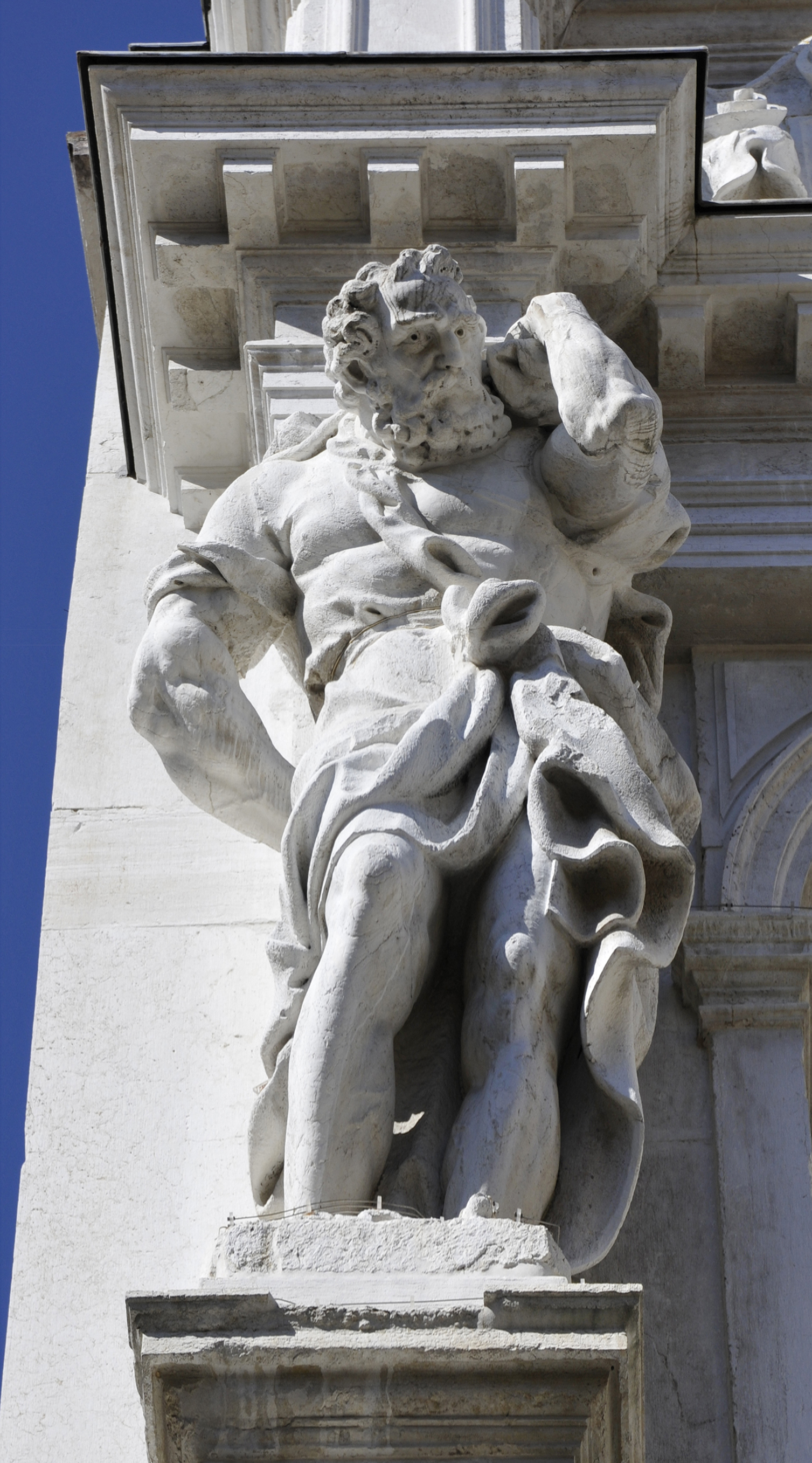

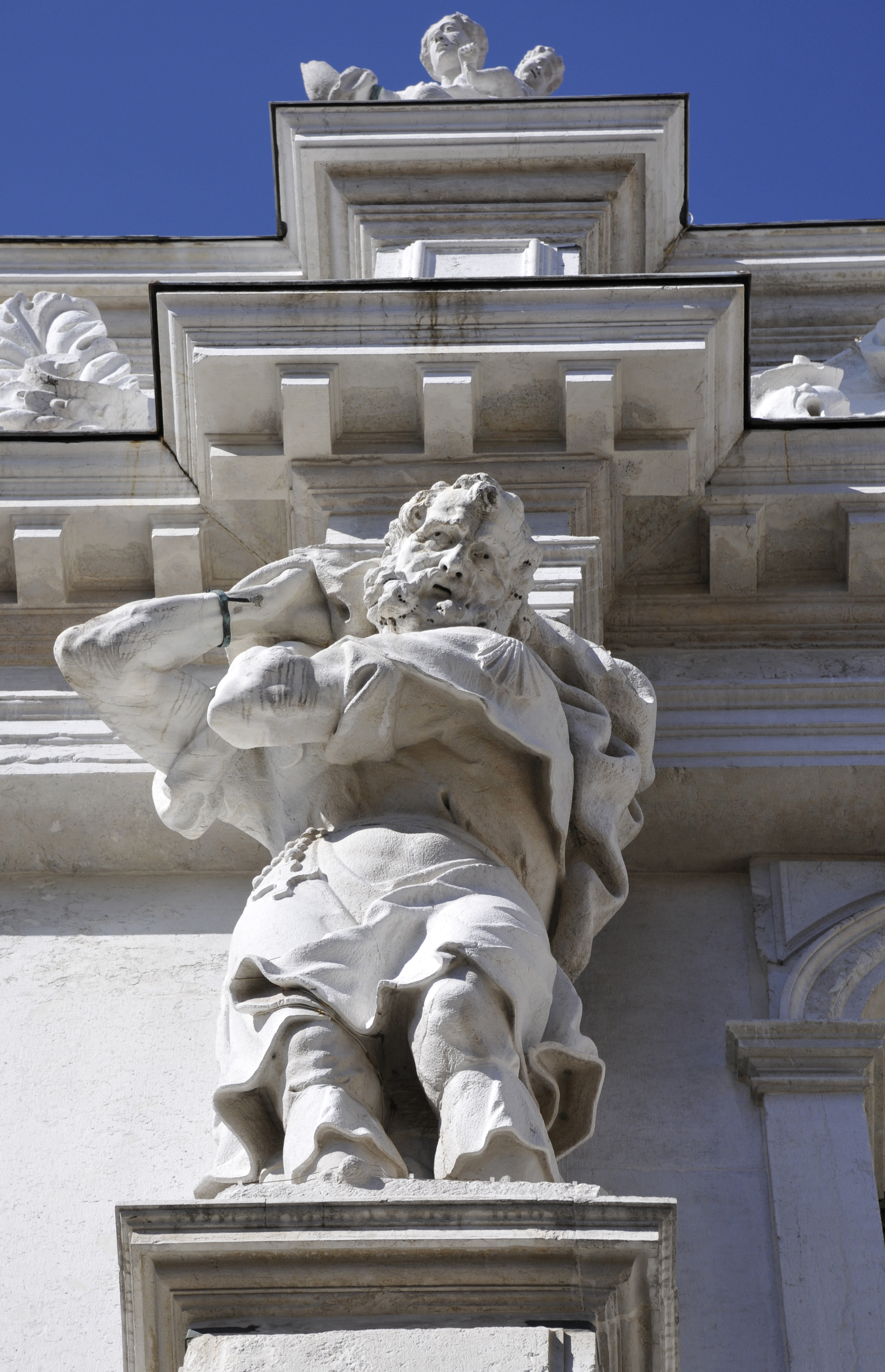

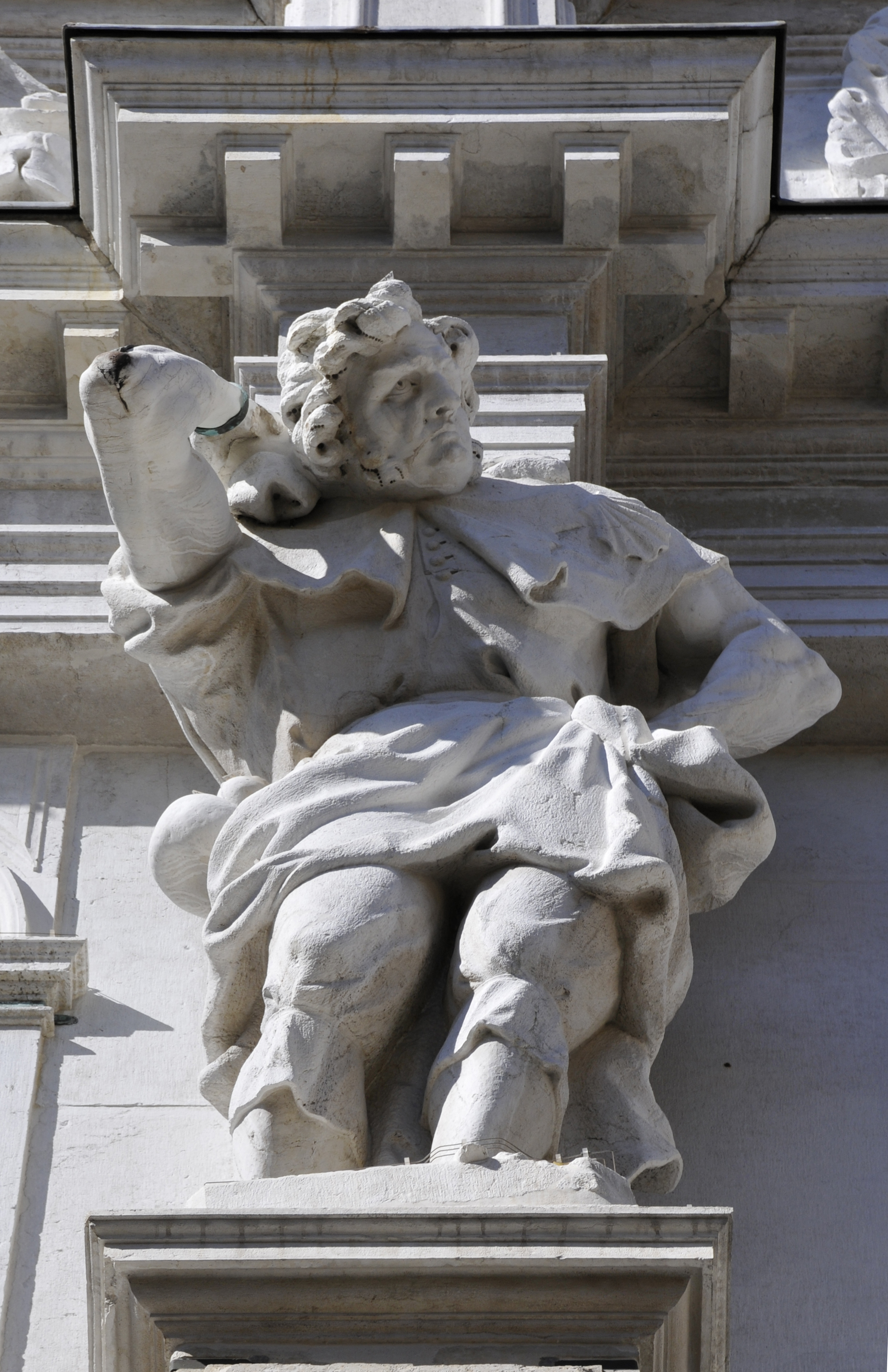

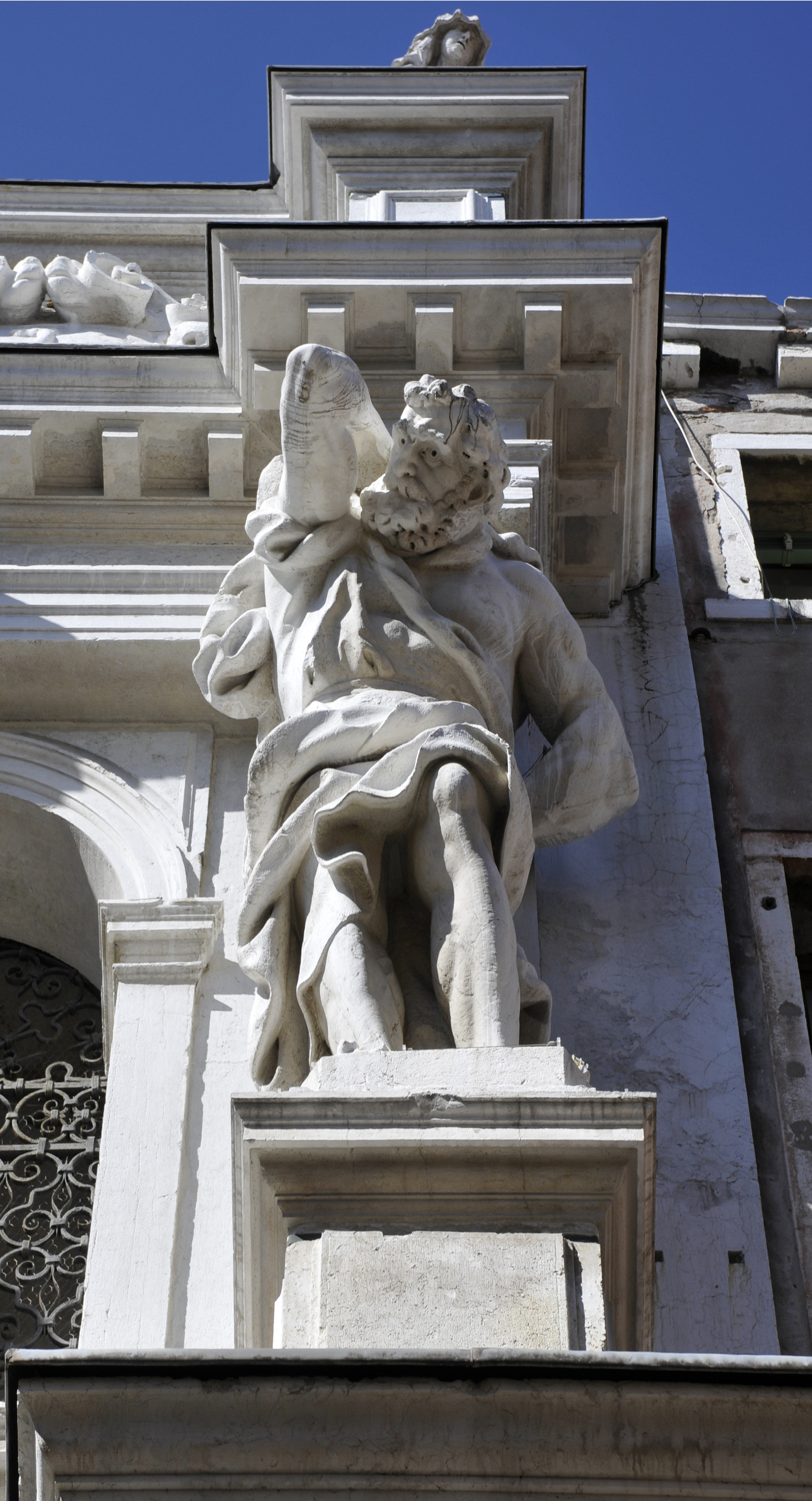
