= Scuola vecchia della Misericordia =

Charity building in Venice, Italy

Coordinates: 45°26′37″N 12°20′05″E

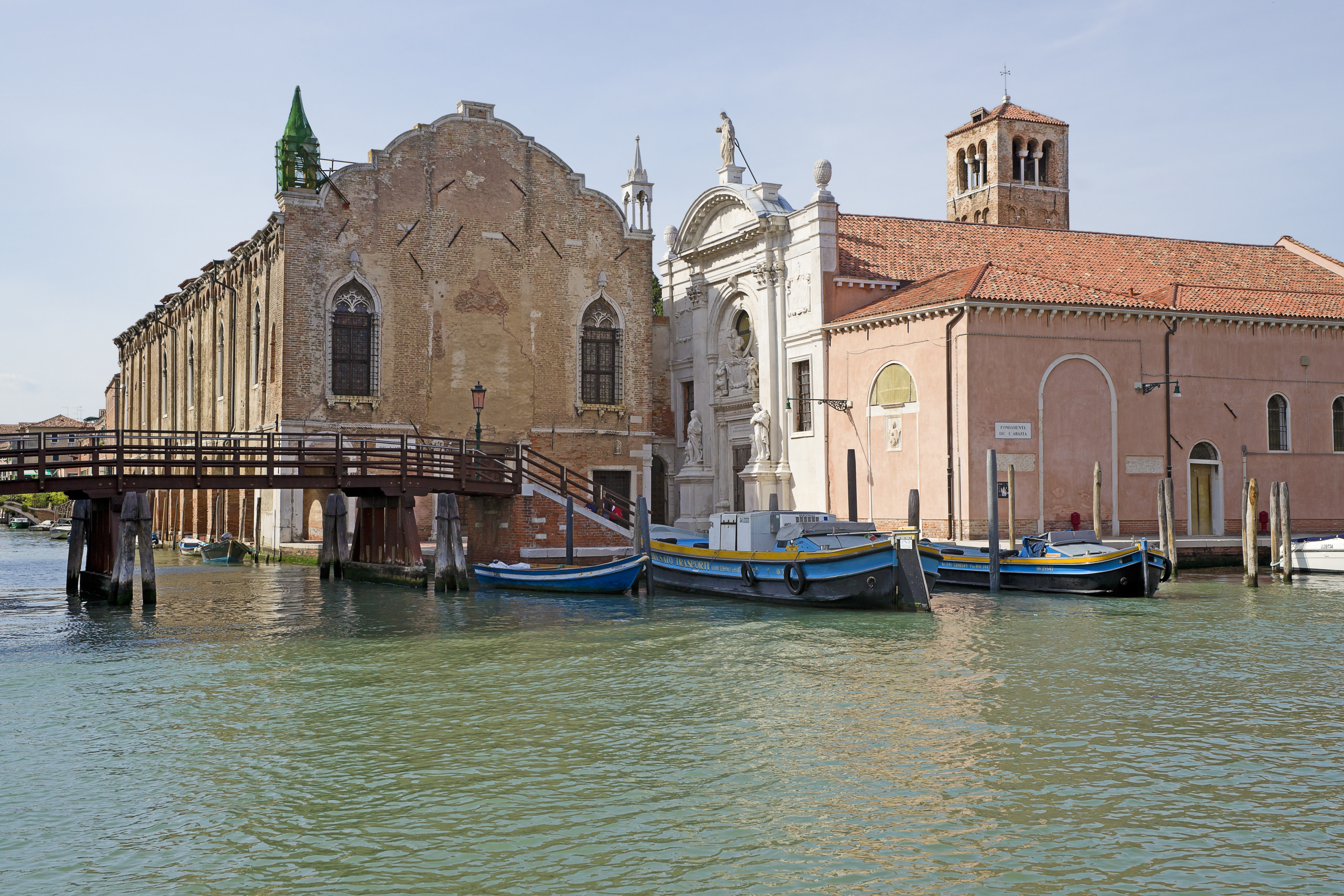
Church of Santa Maria della Misericordia and Scuola Vecchia della Misericordia

The Scuola vecchia della Misericordia ("Old School of Mercy") is a former charity building in Venice, Italy, in the sestiere of Cannaregio. It is located near the north margin of the city, at the intersections of Rio della Sensa and the confluence of Rio di Noale and Rio di San Falice.

It was also known as the Scuola Grande di Santa Maria della Misericordia. It was erected in 1310 and subsequently enlarged several times; in Venice a scuola was the seat of a charity/religious institution. By the early 16th century, the old church had joined with the nearby Franciscan abbey, and the old meeting hall had been rented out. Construction of a new Scuola meeting hall, the Scuola Nuova della Misericordia was begun in 1507 across the Rio dell Sensa, next to the Palazzo da Lezze. However, 25 years later this was only a foundation, and new designs by Jacopo Sansovino completed the two-story brick structure. This was never faced with marble or stone, and sold in 1634 to the guild of silk weavers. The Scuola Nuova has been recently restored.

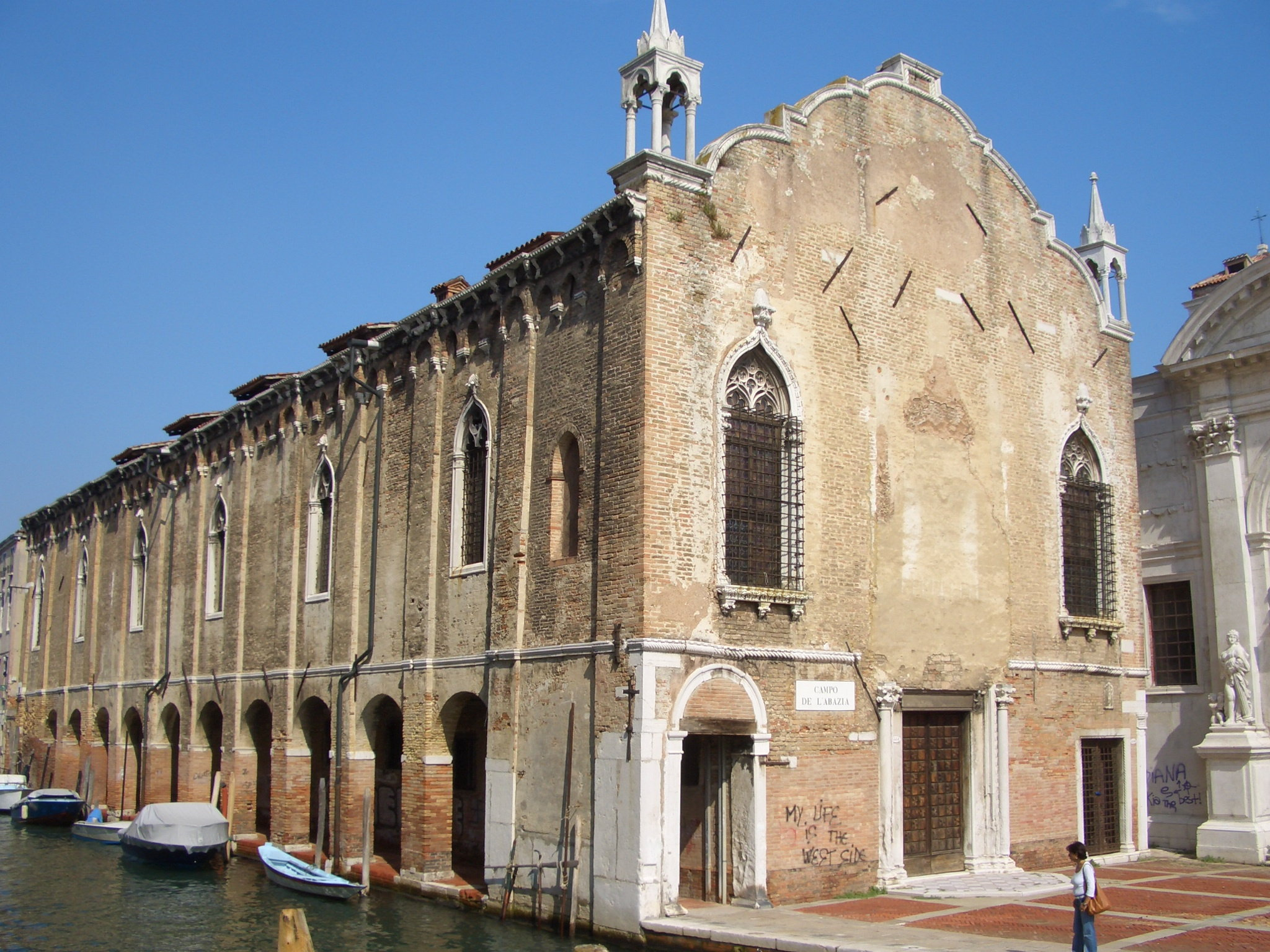
Scuola vecchia della Misericordia.

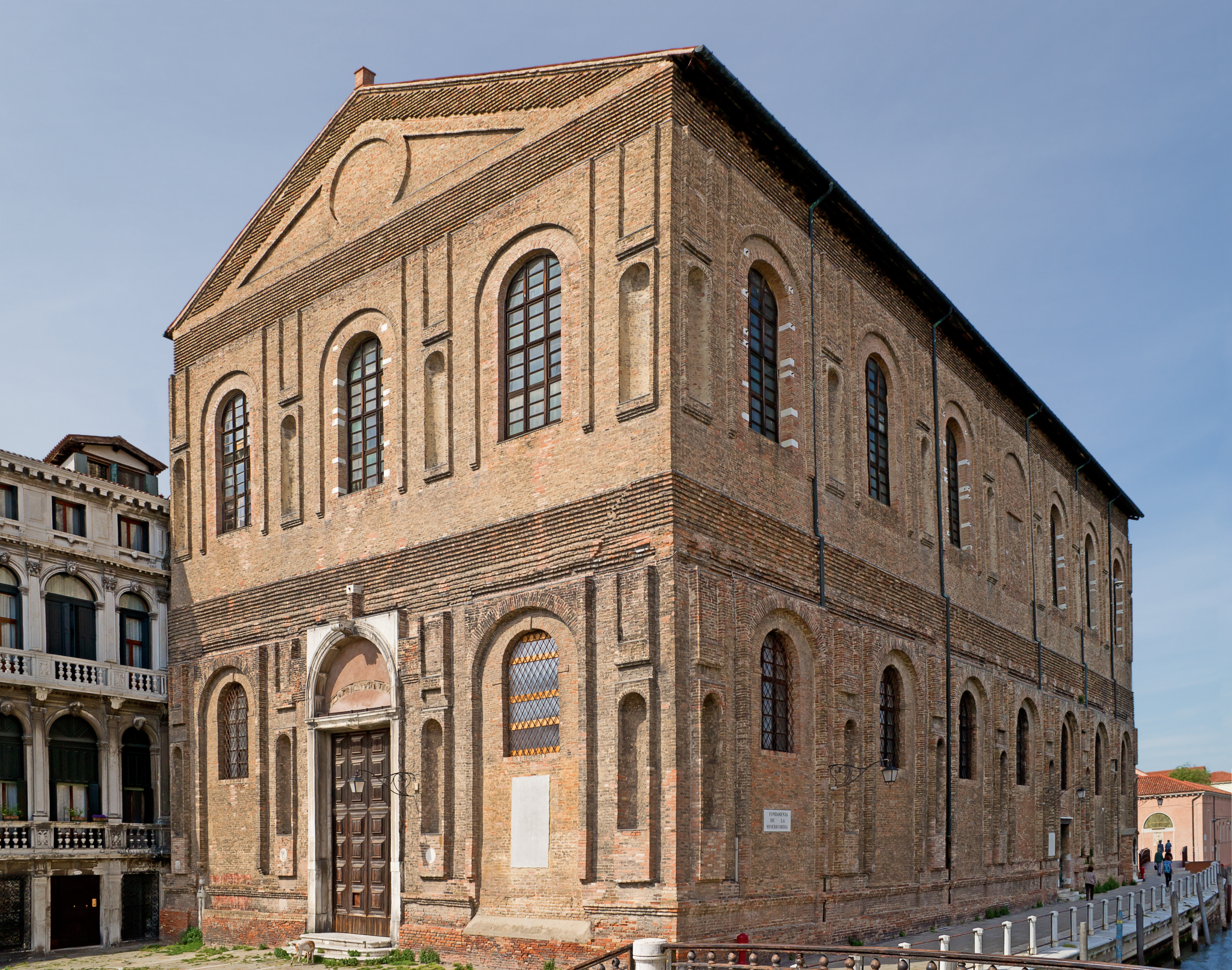
Scuola nuova della Misericordia

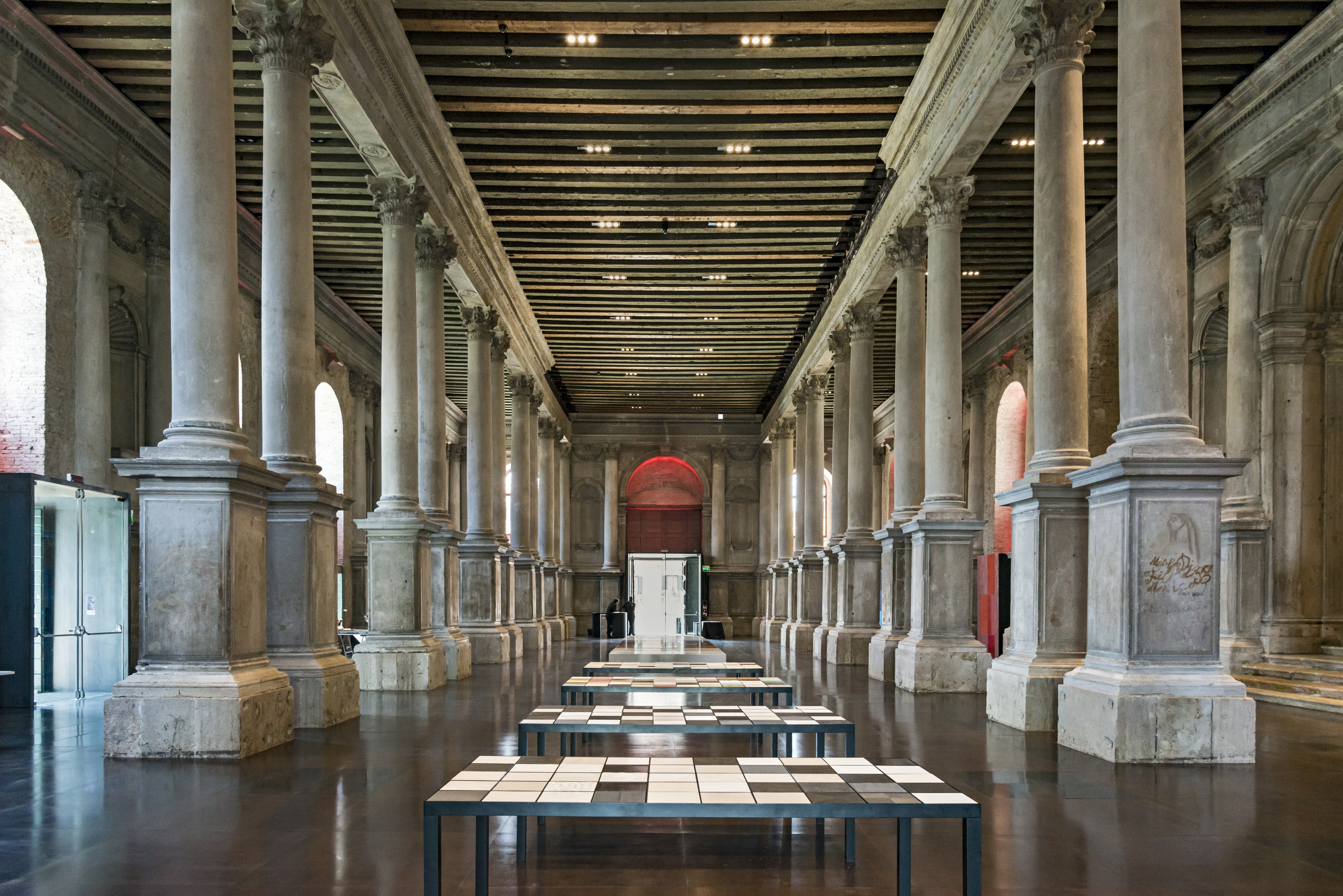
The showroom on the ground floor.

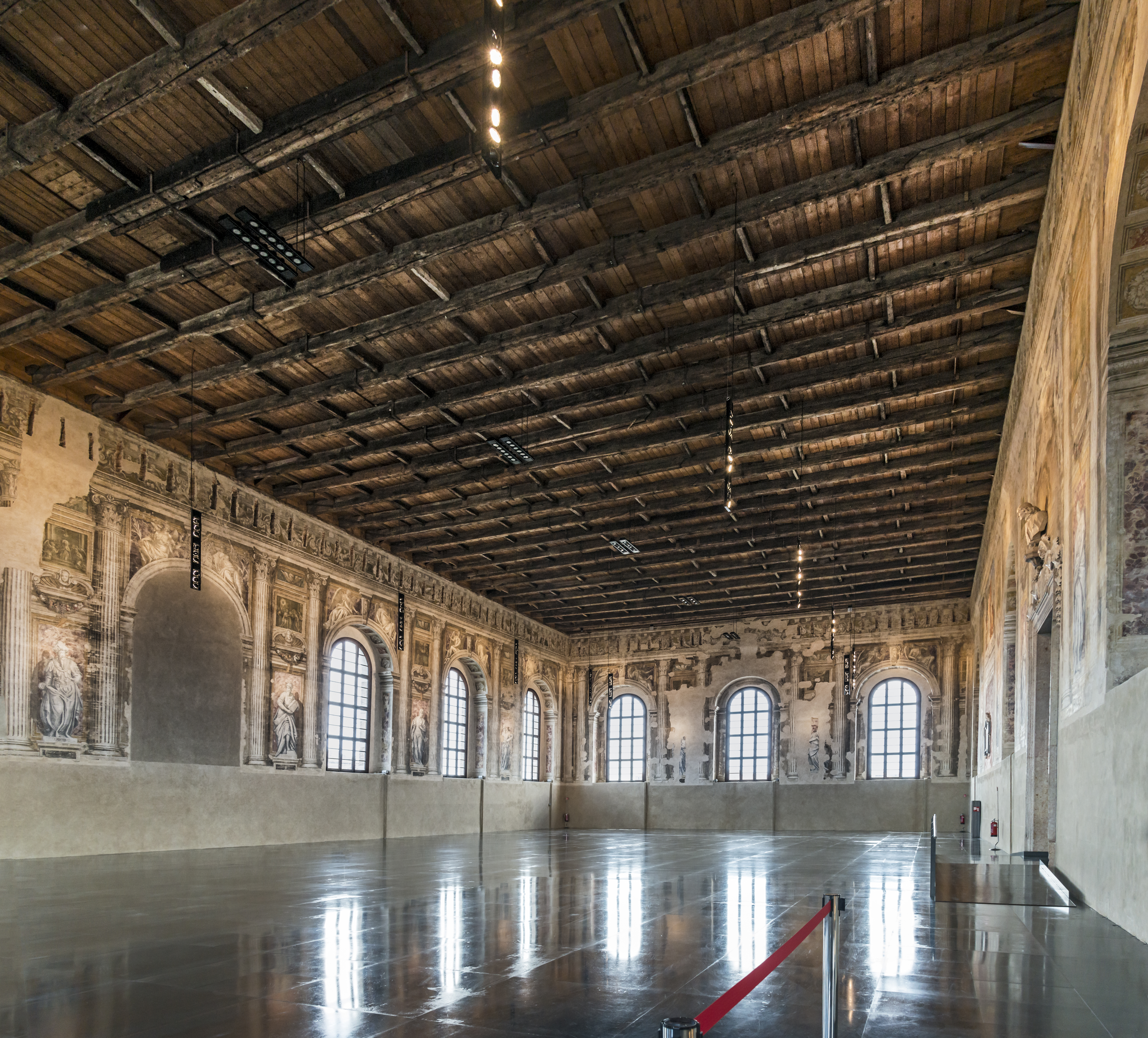
The concert hall on the 1st floor.
