= Abbazia della Misericordia =

Church and abbey in Venice, Italy

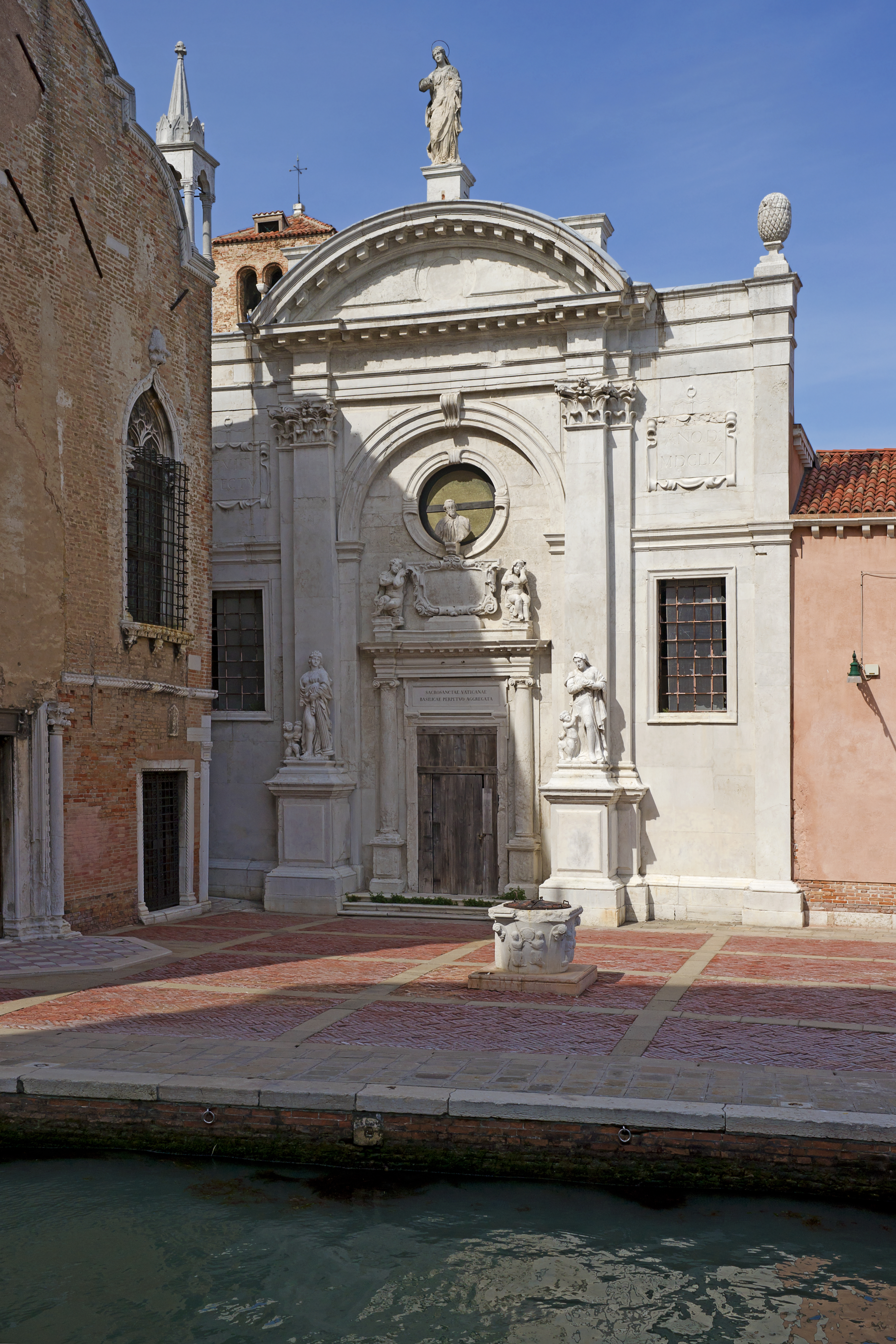

- Location within Venice Location within Italy

Religion
- Affiliation: Roman Catholic
- Province: Venice

Location
- Location: Venice, Italy
- Interactive map of Abbazia della Misericordia
- Coordinates: 45°26′37.95″N 12°20′6.59″E

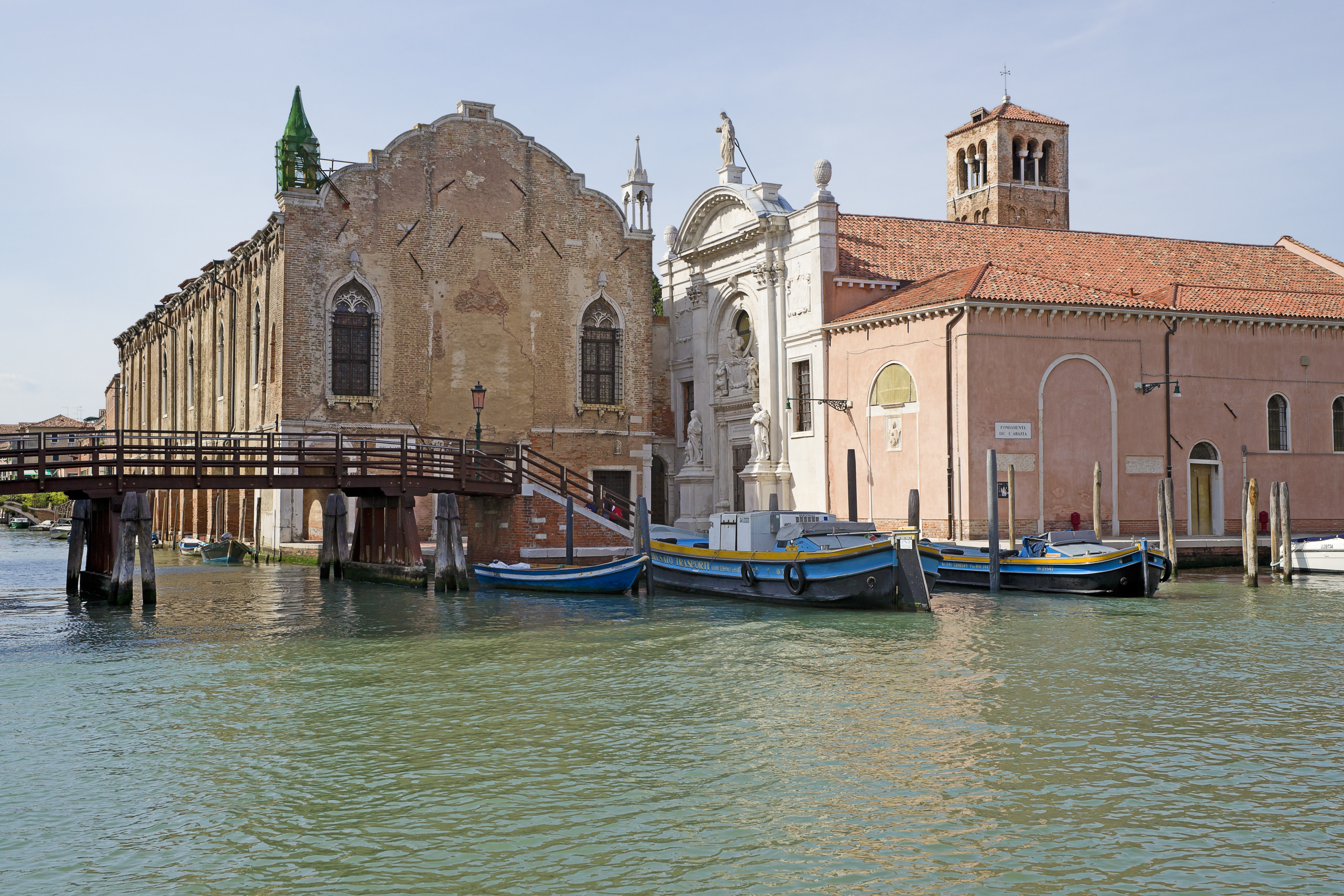
Church of the Abbazia della Misericordia and Scuola vecchia della Misericordia

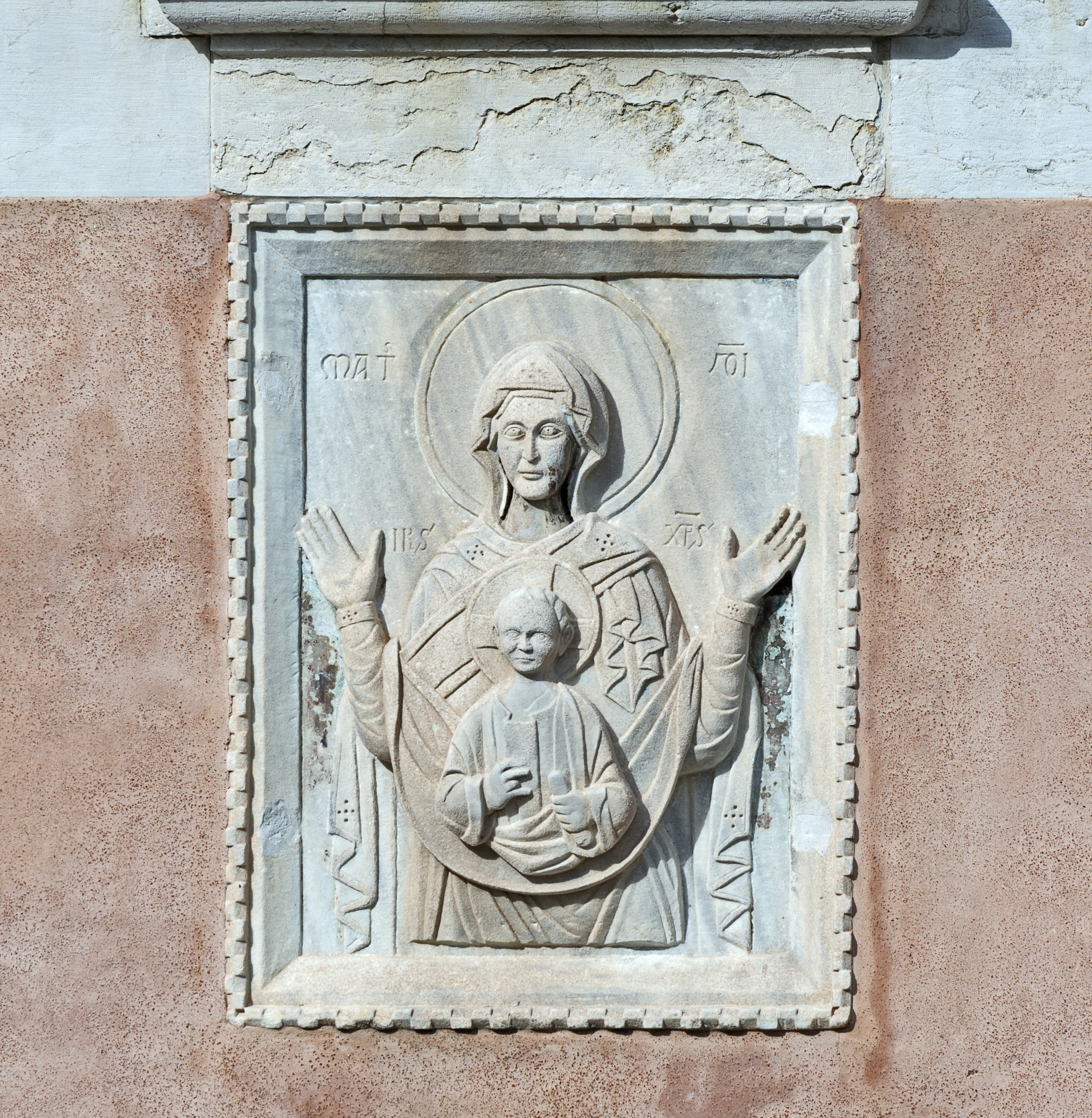
Madonna with Child

The Church of the Abbey of Misericordia (Italian: Santa Maria dell'Abbazia della Misericordia or Santa Maria di Valverde) is a religious edifice in Venice, Italy, in the sestiere Cannaregio.

== History ==
It was founded in the tenth century. The façade was restored in 1659 by the patrician Gaspare Moro. It is decorated by allegoric statues, including a bust of Moro, all work by Clemente Molli. On the right is a 13th-century bas-relief depicting the Madonna with Child.

The church was in decay in the 19th century, and was restored until 1864. It is adjacent to the Scuola vecchia della Misericordia.

== See also ==
· · ·
