= Francesco Cavrioli =

Italian sculptor

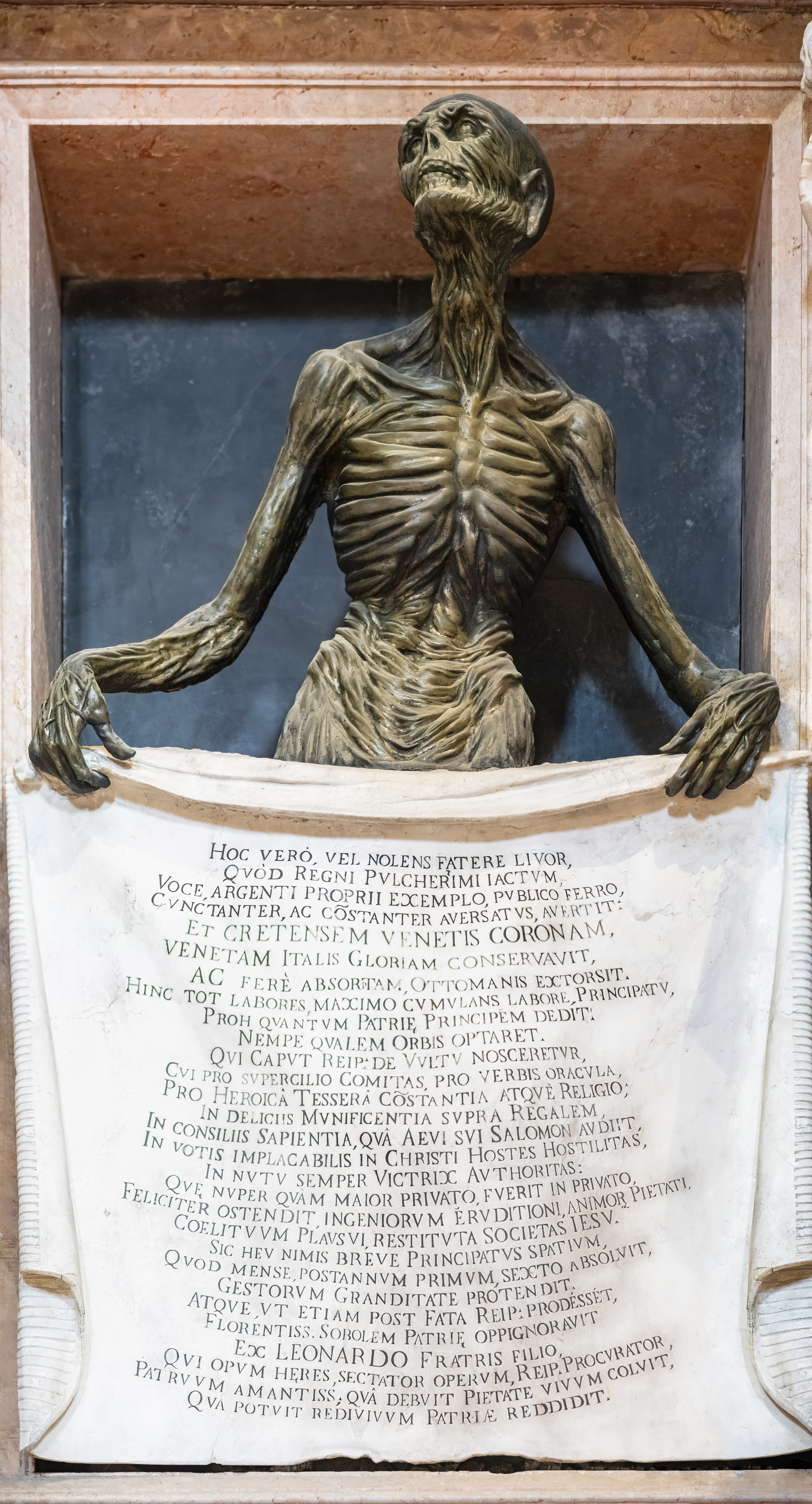

Francesco Cavrioli (c. 1600 – 1670) was an Italian Baroque sculptor, active in Venice.

== Biography ==
Born in Serravalle, Vittorio Veneto, we know little about his initial training. By 1632, he had sculpted four angels for the main altar of the Church of Santi Giovanni e Paolo in Venice. He then began to collaborate on work for Longhena. In 1637, he completed two sibyls for the entrance portal of the Basilica di Santa Maria della Salute. In 1644, he sculpted the statue depicting Venice for the stairs of the Convent at San Giorgio Maggiore. Around 1649, he completed, alongside Clemente Molli, some statues for the altar of the Blessed Lorenzo Giuliani in the basilica of San Pietro di Castello. In the 1950s, he sculpted a statue of St. Paul and a crucifix for the altar of Victory in the Church of Santi Giovanni e Paolo. In 1661, he was commissioned to she Rin Christ for the church of the Tolentini, but no remains of this sculpture survive. In 1663, he also completed two allegorical statues depicting Prudence and Magnaminity, and the Cavazza coat of arms, for the typanum of the Monument to Gerolamo Cavazza, designed in 1657 by Giuseppe Sardi, in the Church of the Madonna dell'Orto. Cavrioli's died in September 1670, a fact mentioned in 1672 documents relating to dispute between Longhena and Cavrioli's brothers.

== Bibliography ==
- La scultura veneta del Seicento e del Settecento, Camillo Semenzato: 1966, Alfieri editor, Venice.
- La scultura veneta del Seicento e del Settecento: nuovi studi, curated by Giuseppe Pavanello, editor: Istituto veneto di scienze, lettere ed arti, Venice 2002.
