= List of libraries in Italy =

Listicle of libraries in Italy

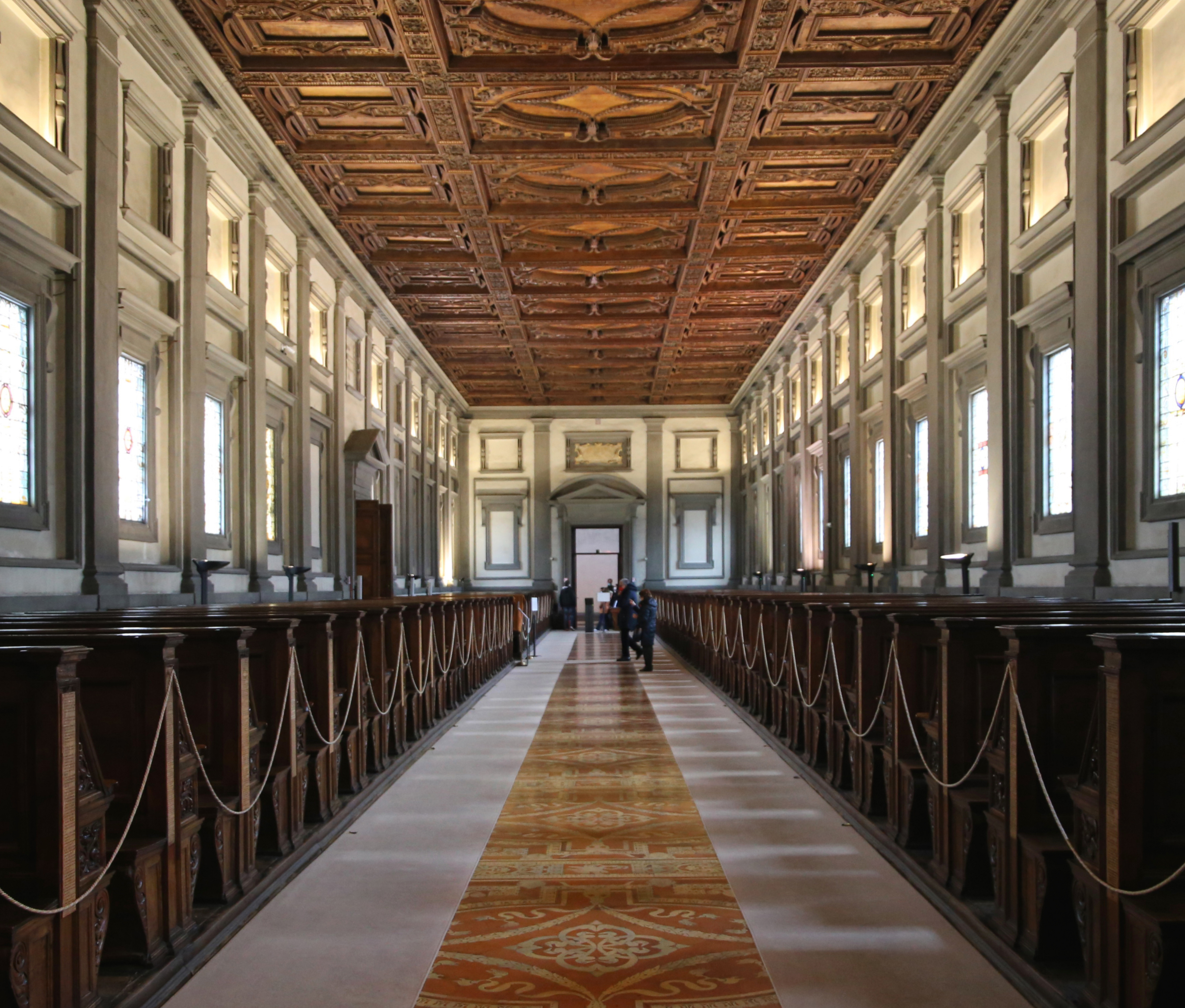
Laurentian Library, Tuscany, Florence

This is a list of notable libraries in Italy, arranged by region.

== Northeast ==
=== Emilia-Romagna ===
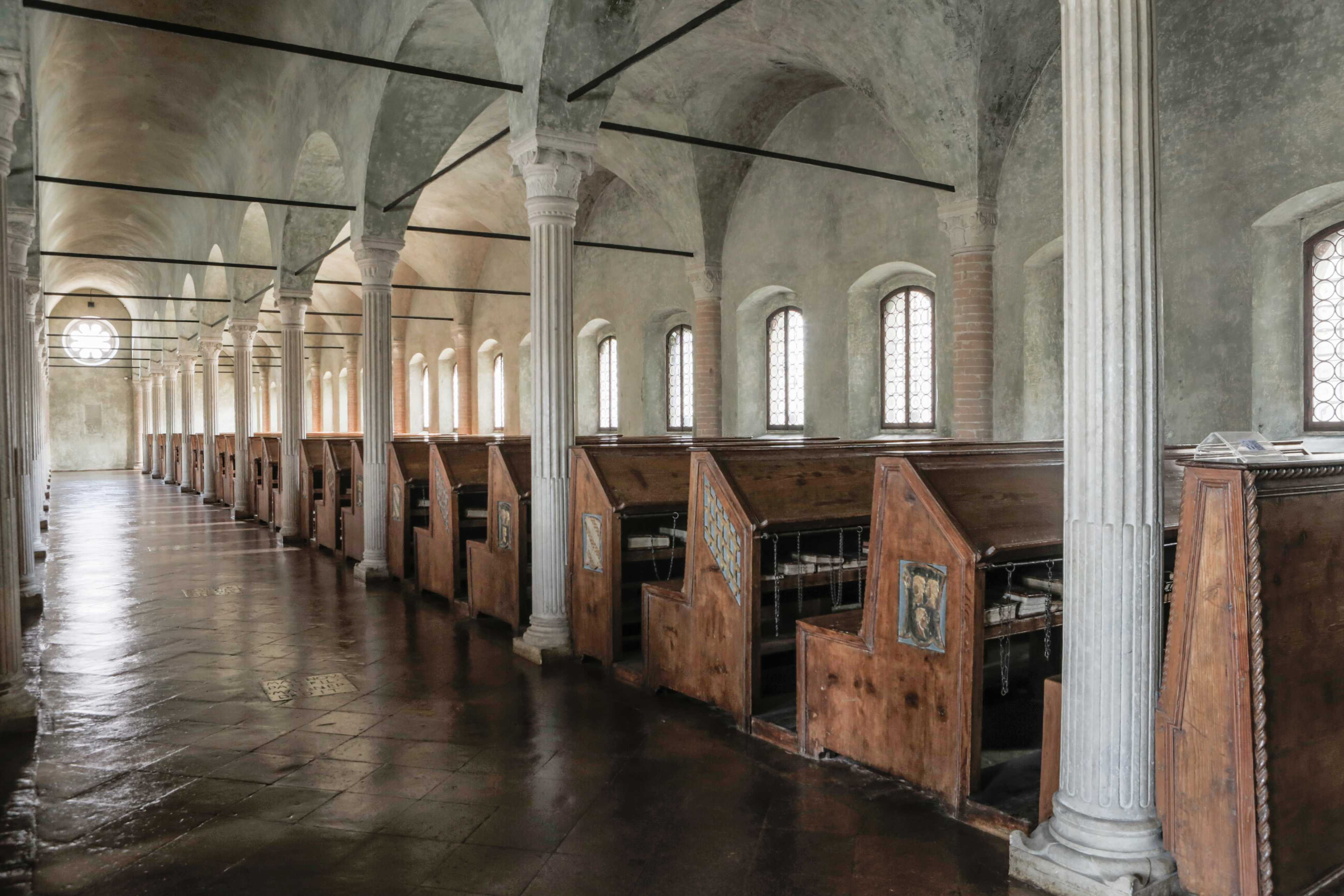
Biblioteca Malatestiana, Emilia-Romagna, Cesena

See also: Libraries of Bologna (in Italian)

- Archiginnasio of Bologna
- Biblioteca comunale dell'Archiginnasio, Bologna
- Biblioteca Salaborsa, Bologna
- Biblioteca of San Domenico, Bologna
- Biblioteca Salaborsa, Bologna
- Museo internazionale e biblioteca della musica, Bologna
- Biblioteca comunale Cesare Pavese, Casalecchio sul Reno
- Biblioteca Malatestiana, Cesena
- Malatestiana Library, Cesena
- Biblioteca Comunale Ariostea, Ferrara
- Biblioteca Estense, Ferrara
- Biblioteca comunale Aurelio Saffi, Forlì
- Biblioteca comunale Eugenio Garin, Mirandola
- Biblioteca civica di Parma
- Biblioteca di San Giovanni Evangelista, Parma
- Biblioteca Guanda, Parma
- Biblioteca Umberto Balestrazzi, Parma
- Biblioteca Palatina, Parma
- Biblioteca Passerini-Landi, Piacenza
- Biblioteca Classense, Ravenna
- Biblioteca di storia contemporanea Alfredo Oriani, Ravenna
- Biblioteca Panizzi, Reggio Emilia
- Biblioteca Civica Gambalunga, Rimini
- Biblioteca Malatestiana di San Francesco, Rimini

=== Friuli-Venezia Giulia ===
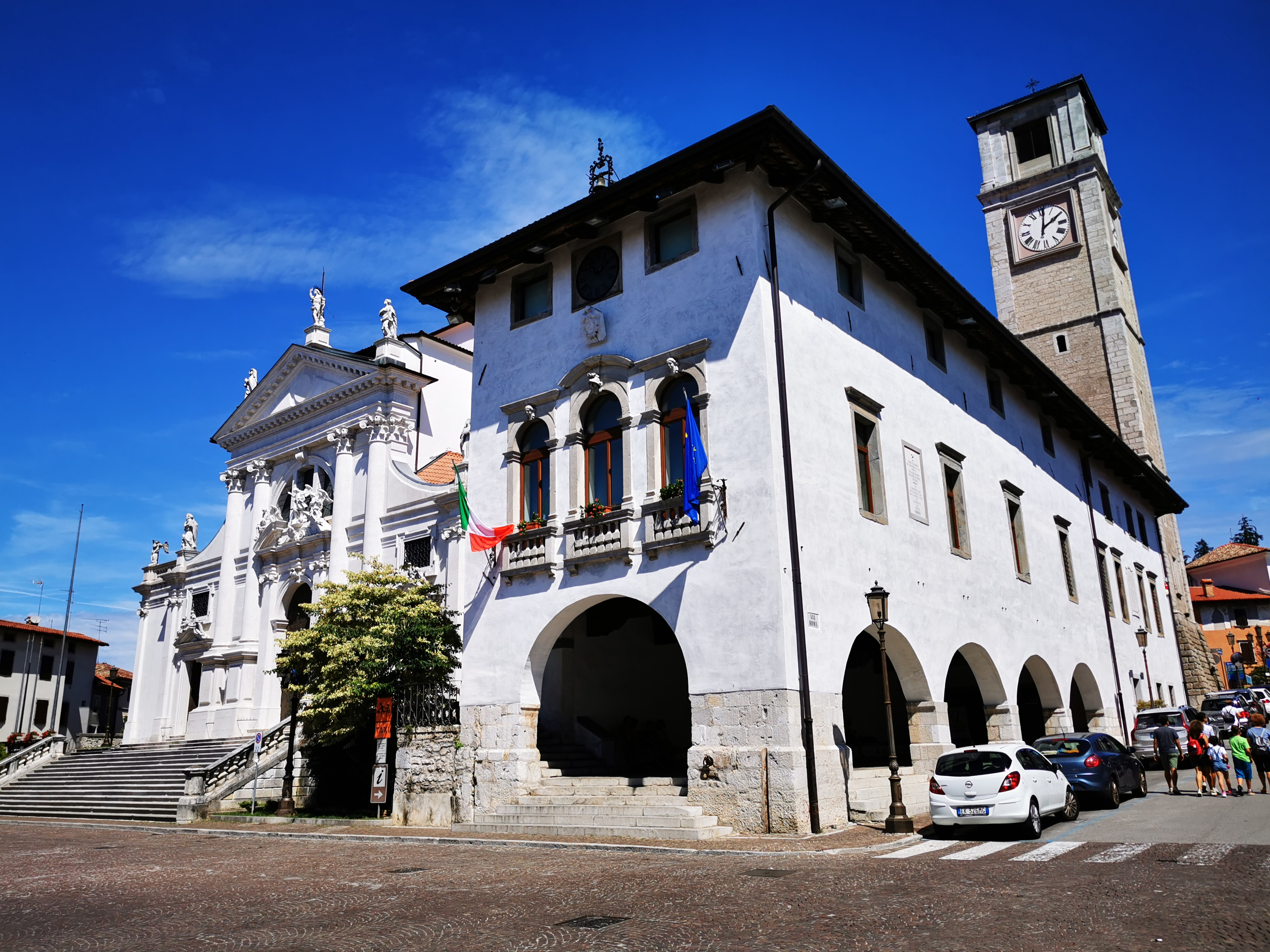
Biblioteca Guarneriana, Friuli-Venezia Giulia, San Daniele del Friuli

- Biblioteca statale Isontina, Gorizia
- Biblioteca del Seminario diocesano di Concordia-Pordenone
- Biblioteca Guarneriana, San Daniele del Friuli
- Biblioteca statale Stelio Crise di Trieste

=== Trentino-Alto Adige/Südtirol ===
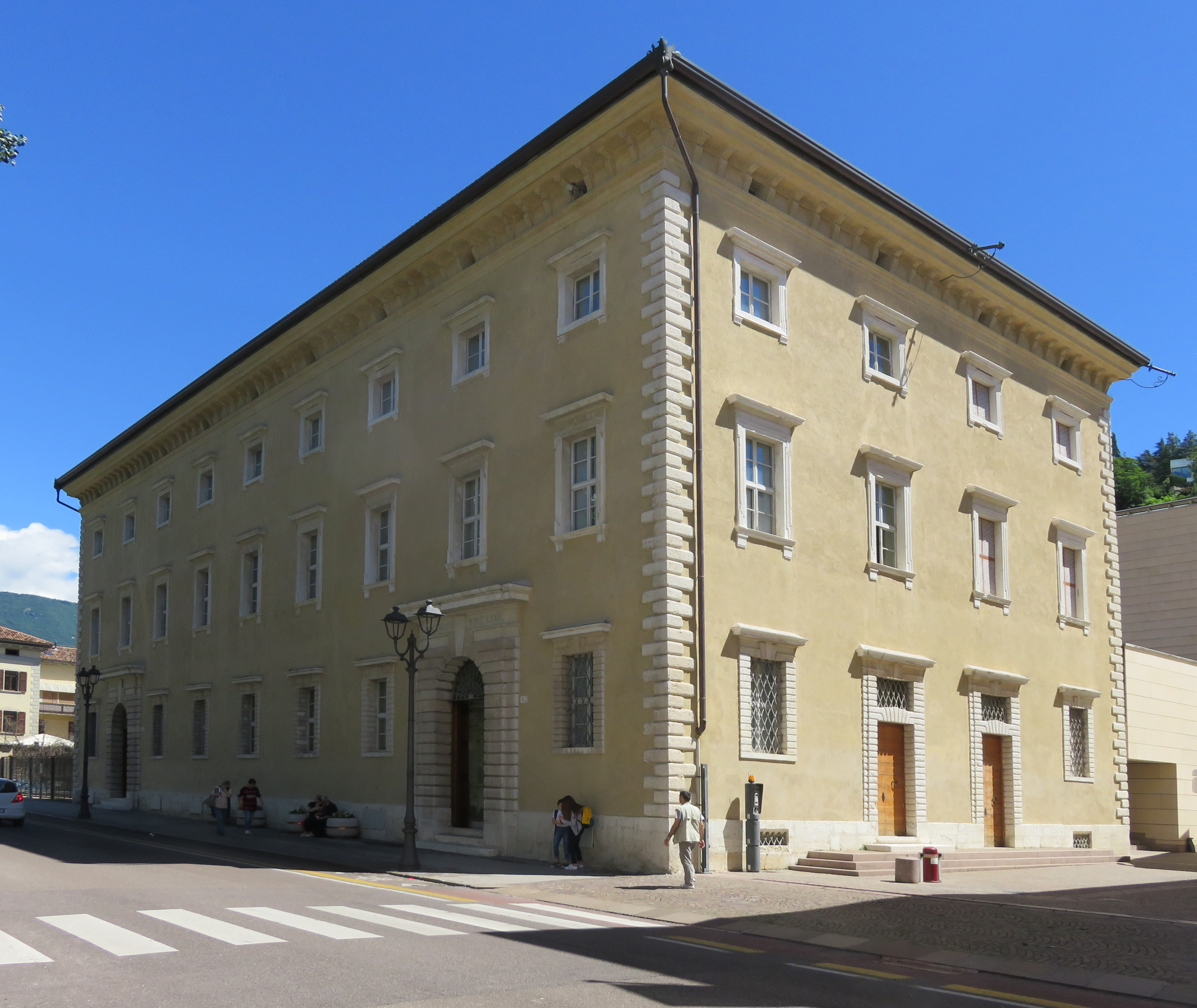
Biblioteca Civica Girolamo Tartarotti, Trentino-Alto Adige/Südtirol, Rovereto

- Biblioteca comunale di Ala
- Biblioteca provinciale Dr. Friedrich Tessmann, Bolzano
- Mediateca Multilingue, Merano
- Biblioteca Civica Girolamo Tartarotti, Rovereto
- Biblioteca comunale di Trento

=== Veneto ===
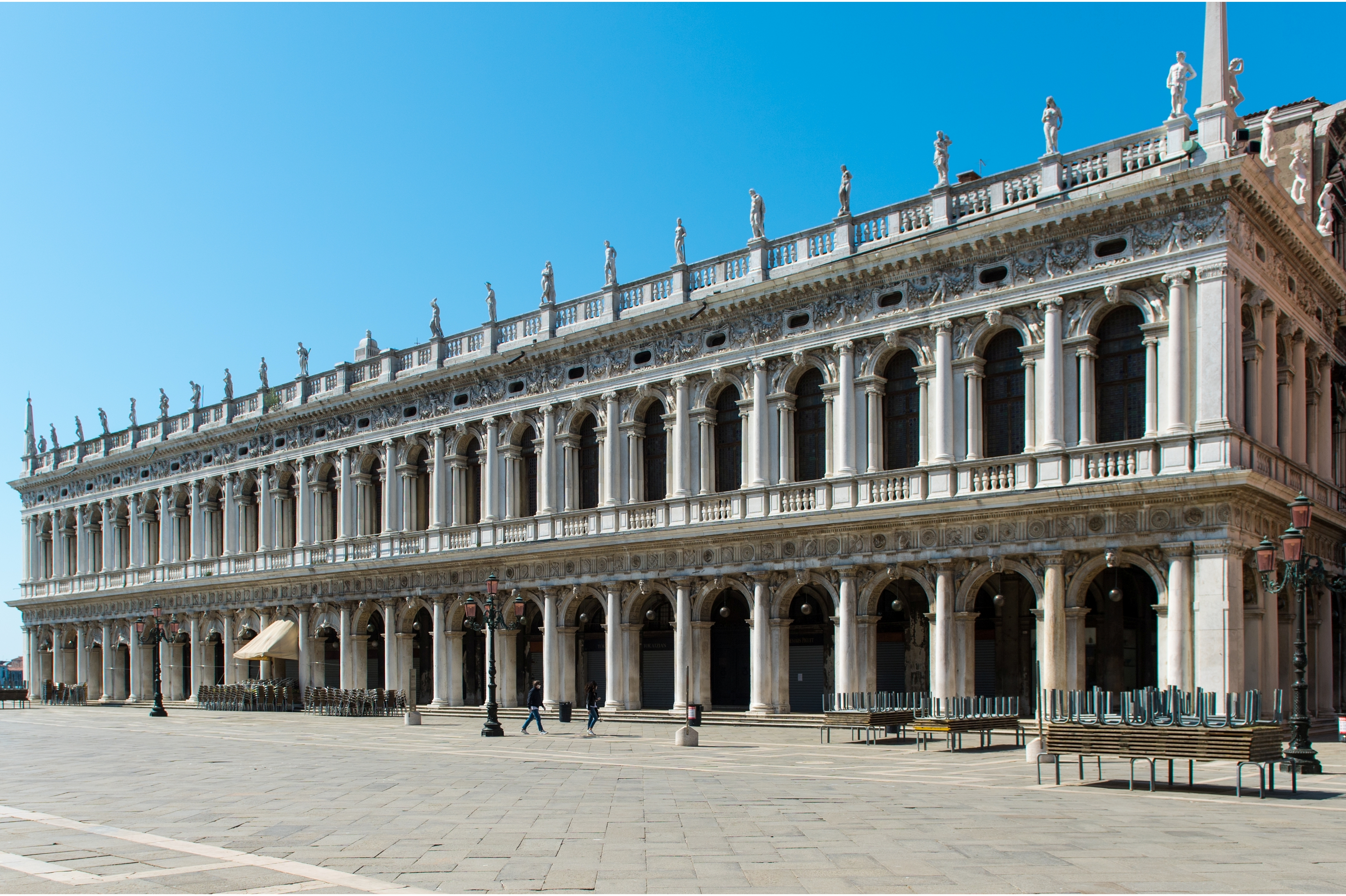
Biblioteca Marciana, Veneto, Venice

- Biblioteca Piloni, Belluno
- Biblioteca storica cadorina, Belluno
- Biblioteca comunale di Monselice
- Accademia Galileiana, Padua
- Biblioteca Civica di Padova, Padua
- Biblioteca Geoscienze Padova
- Biblioteca Pinali, Padua
- Pontificia Biblioteca Antoniana, Padua
- Biblioteca dell'Accademia dei Concordi di Rovigo
- Biblioteca capitolare di Treviso
- Biblioteca comunale di Treviso
- Fondazione Querini Stampalia, Venice
- Fortuny Museum, Venice
- Biblioteca Marciana, Venice
- Petrarch's library, Venice
- Biblioteca Iuav, Venice
- Biblioteca popolare circolante di Murano, Venice
- Biblioteca del Circuito Cinema, Venice
- Biblioteca civica di Mestre, Venice
- Chapter Library of Verona
- Biblioteca centrale Arturo Frinzi, Verona
- Biblioteca civica di Verona
- Biblioteca Civica Bertoliana, Vicenza
- International Library La Vigna, Vicenza

== Northwest ==
=== Aosta Valley ===
- Biblioteca regionale di Aosta

=== Liguria ===
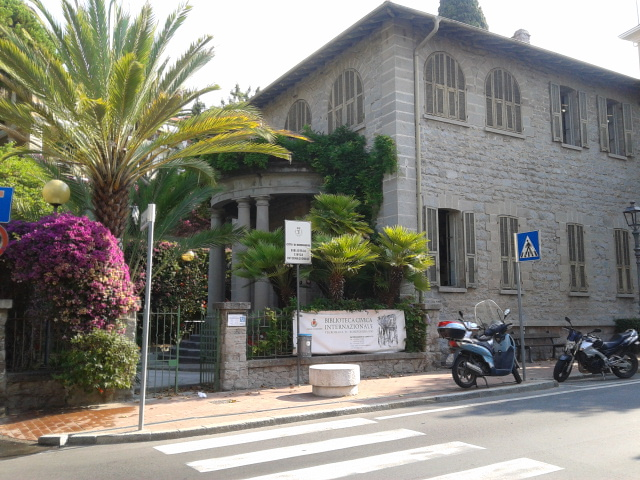
International Civic Library, Liguria, Bordighera

- International Civic Library, Bordighera
- Biblioteca Civica Berio, Genoa
- Biblioteca Internazionale per ragazzi Edmondo de Amicis, Genoa
- Biblioteca Franzoniana, Genoa
- Biblioteca civica Gian Luigi Lercari, Genoa
- Biblioteca comunale Ubaldo Mazzini, La Spezia
- Biblioteca civica Aprosiana, Ventimiglia

=== Lombardy ===
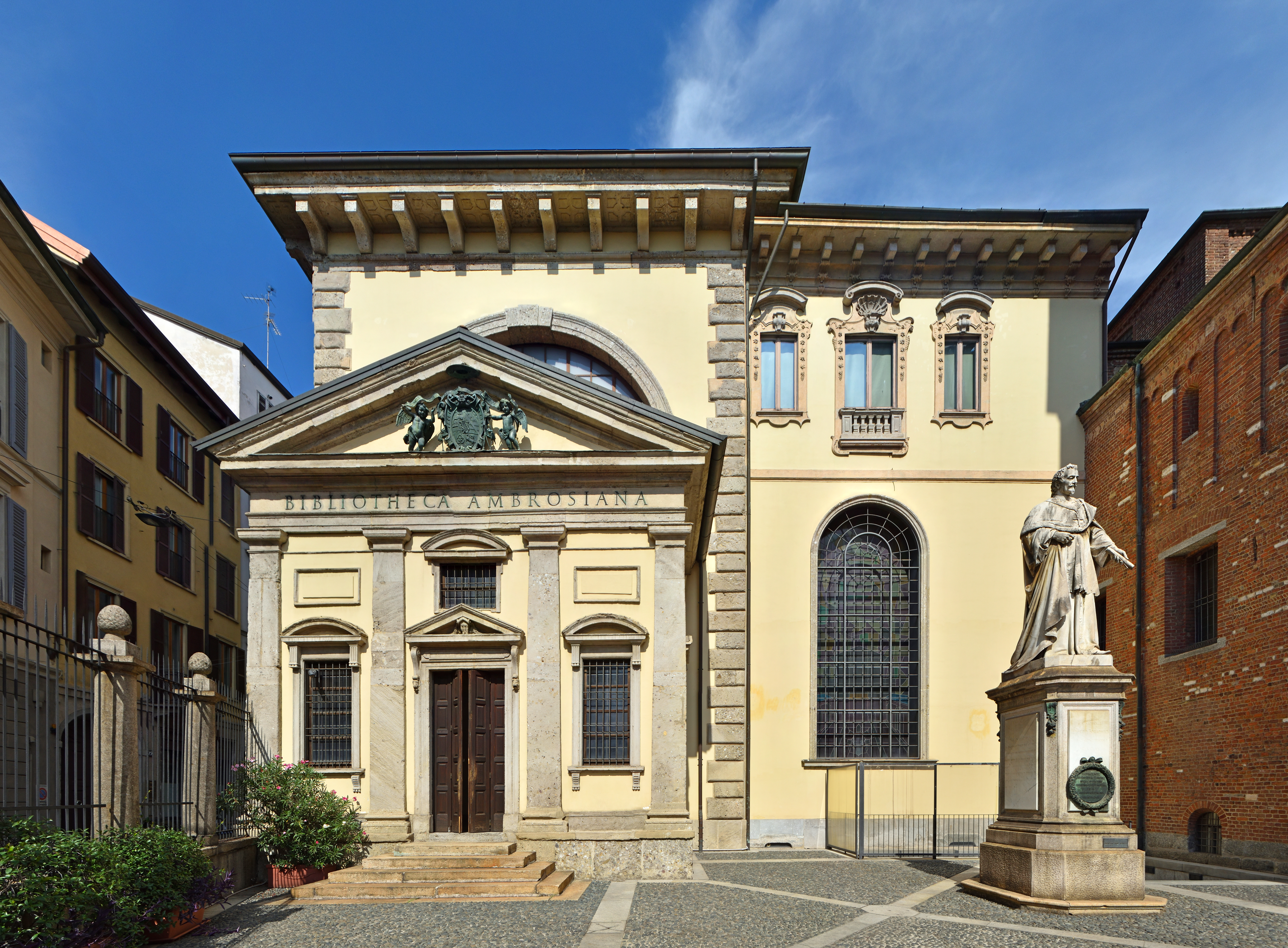
Biblioteca Ambrosiana, Lombardy, Milan

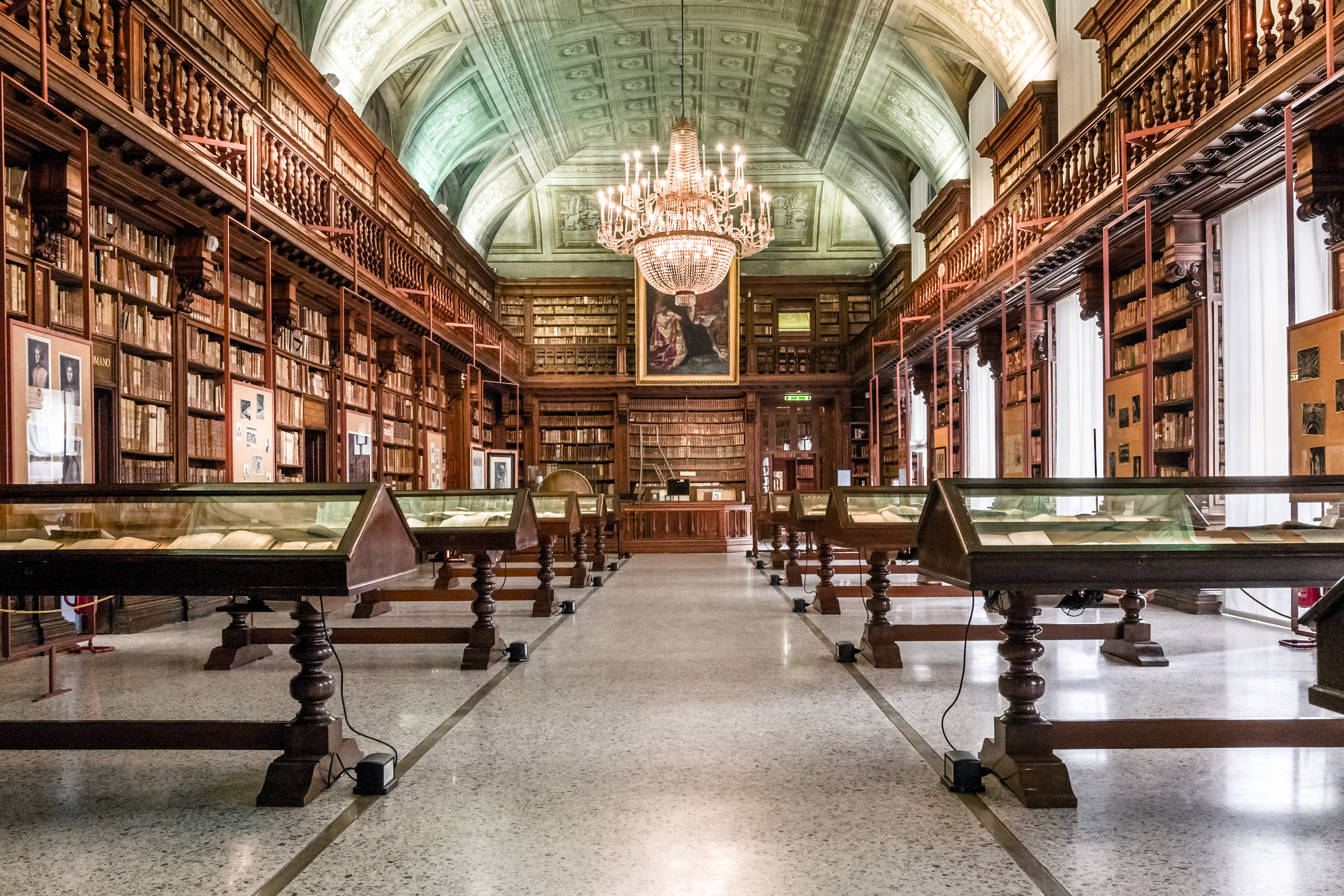
Biblioteca di Brera, Lombardy, Milan

- Biblioteca comunale centrale Antonio Tiraboschi, Bergamo
- Biblioteca Queriniana, Brescia
- Biblioteca capitolare di San Giovanni Battista, Busto Arsizio
- Biblioteca comunale di Busto Arsizio
- Biblioteca comunale di Castel Goffredo
- Biblioteca Comunale Clusone
- Biblioteca comunale Clara Gallini, Crema
- Biblioteca statale di Cremona
- Biblioteca del seminario vescovile di Cremona
- Biblioteca civica Uberto Pozzoli, Lecco
- Biblioteca NH Gian Domenico Oltrona Visconti, Lonate Pozzolo
- Biblioteca Laudense, Lodi
- Biblioteca Teresiana, Mantua
- Biblioteca Mediateca Gino Baratta, Mantua
- Archivio di Nuova Scrittura, Milan
- Biblioteca Ambrosiana, Milan
- Biblioteca comunale centrale di Milano
- Biblioteca europea di informazione e cultura, Milan
- Biblioteca d'Arte del Castello Sforzesco, Milan
- Biblioteca di Brera, Milan
- Biblioteca europea di informazione e cultura, Milan
- Biblioteca Trivulziana, Milan
- Centro di Documentazione Ebraica Contemporanea, Milan
- Mansutti Foundation, Milan
- Museo Teatrale alla Scala, Milan
- Biblioteca del conservatorio Giuseppe Verdi, Milan
- Biblioteca del Consiglio regionale della Lombardia, Milan
- Library of the Civic Museum of Natural History of Milan
- Biblioteca dell'Istituto per la scienza dell'amministrazione pubblica, Milan
- Biblioteca provinciale dei Carmelitani scalzi, Milan
- Biblioteca al Parco, Milan
- Biblioteca capitolare di Monza
- Biblioteca civica Ezio Vanoni, Morbegno
- Biblioteca Civica Carlo Bonetta, Pavia
- Biblioteca visconteo sforzesca, Pavia
- Biblioteca civica Ezio Vanoni}, Sondrio

=== Piedmont ===
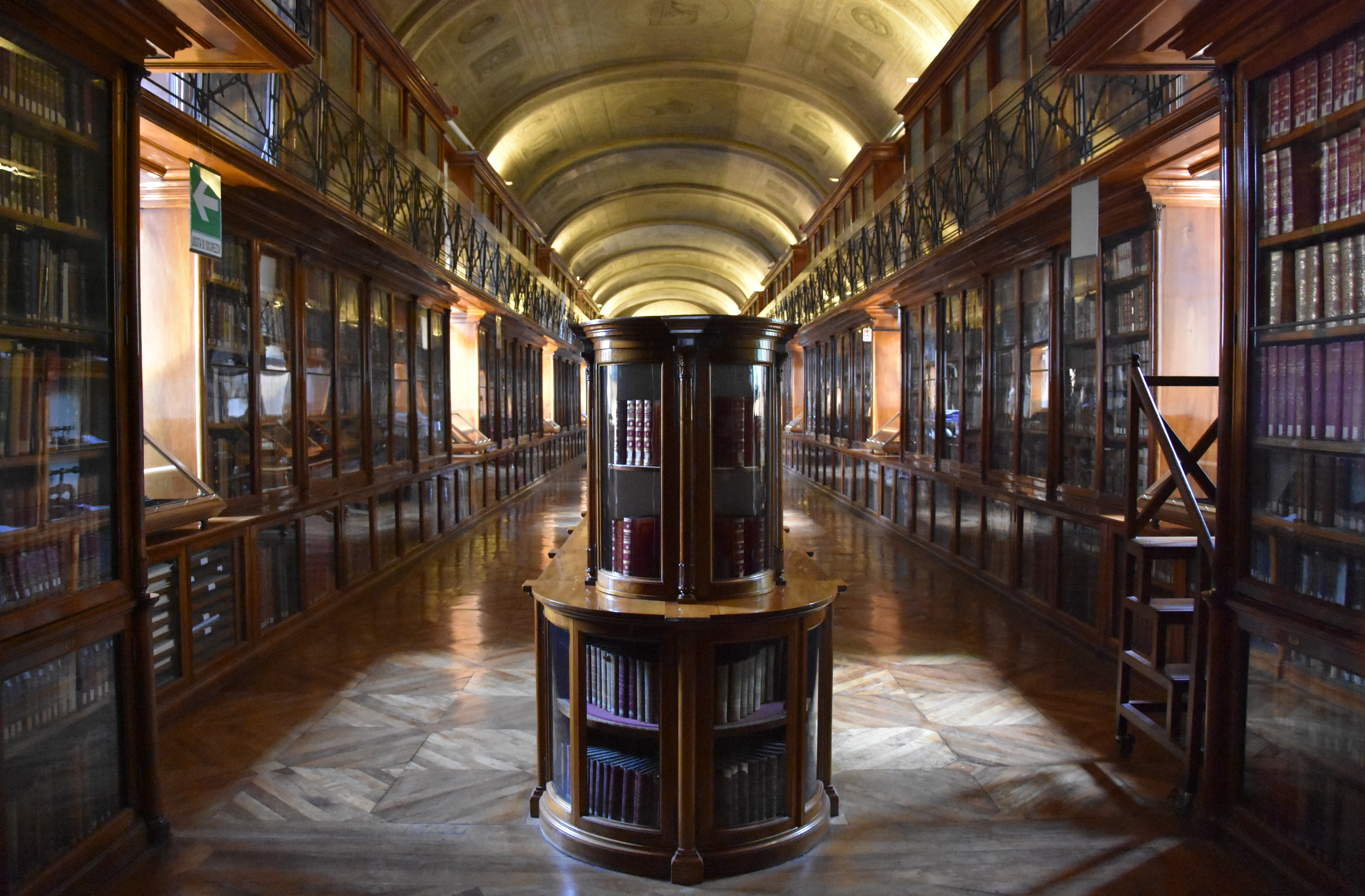
Royal Library of Turin, Piedmont

- Biblioteca del Seminario Vescovile di Asti
- Biblioteca civica Giovanni Canna, Casale Monferrato
- Biblioteca civica Antonio Arduino, Moncalieri
- Biblioteca Civica Centrale, Turin
- Royal Library of Turin
- Bibliomediateca di Cinema e Fotografia "Mario Gromo", Turin
- Biblioteca civica Italo Calvino, Turin
- Biblioteca civica Luigi Carluccio, Turin
- Biblioteca di storia e cultura del Piemonte "Giuseppe Grosso", Turin
- Biblioteca Nazionale del Club Alpino Italiano, Turin
- Biblioteca nazionale di Torino
- Biblioteca capitolare di Vercelli

== Central ==
=== Marche ===
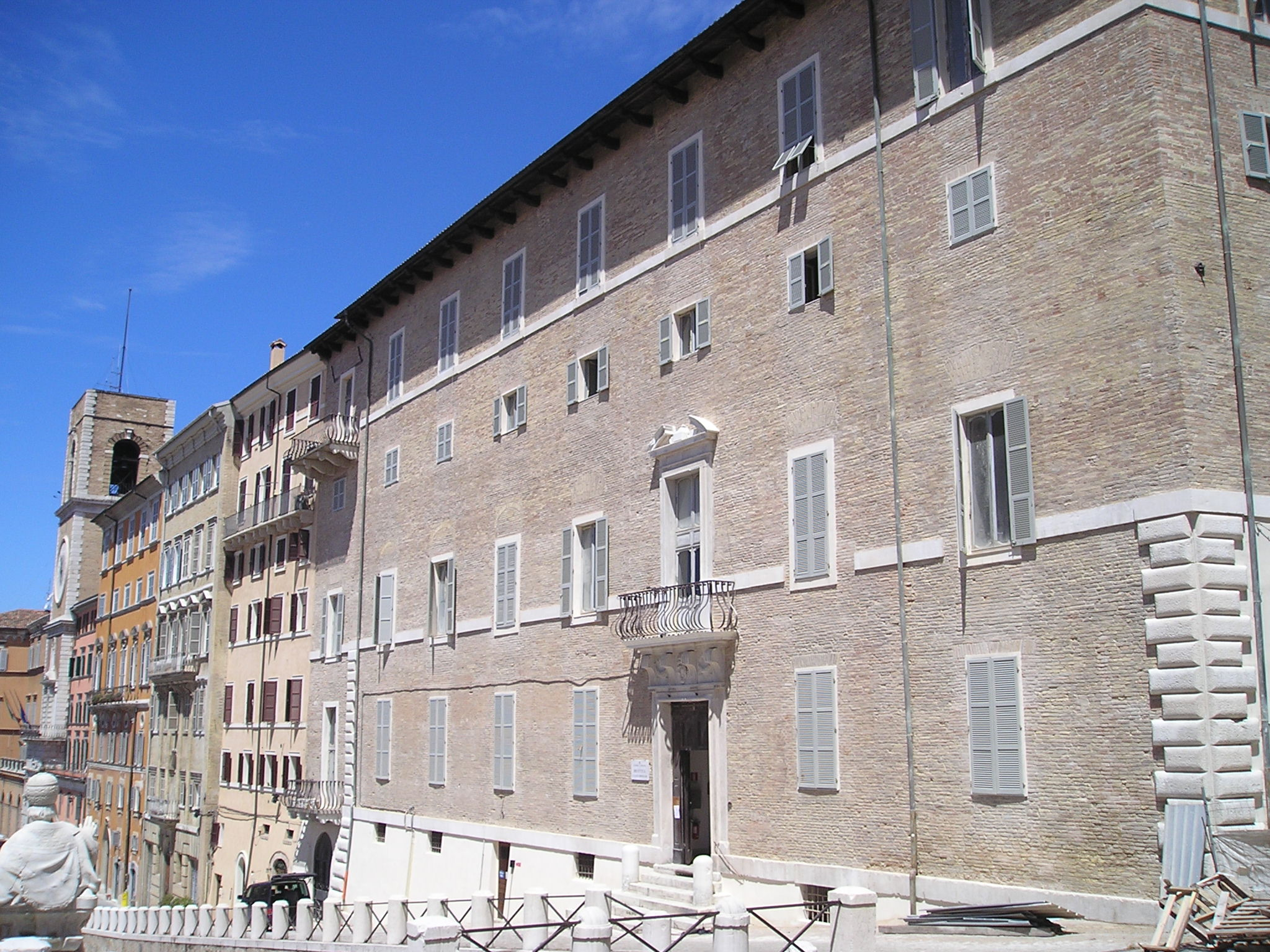
Biblioteca comunale Luciano Benincasa, Marche, Ancona

- Biblioteca comunale Luciano Benincasa, Ancona
- Biblioteca della Soprintendenza archeologica di Ancona
- Biblioteca comunale Giulio Gabrielli, Ascoli Piceno
- Biblioteca storico-francescana e picena San Giacomo della Marca, Falconara Marittima
- Archivio Biblioteca Enrico Travaglini, Fano
- Biblioteca Federiciana, Fano
- Mediateca Montanari, Fano
- Biblioteca Spezioli, Fermo
- Biblioteca comunale Planettiana, Jesi
- Biblioteca storica Cassiano Beligatti, Macerata
- Biblioteca Comunale Mozzi Borgetti, Macerata
- Biblioteca statale di Macerata
- Biblioteca comunale Libero Bigiaretti, Matelica
- Biblioteca storica dell'Istituto Campana per l'Istruzione Permanente, Osimo
- Biblioteca comunale Francesco Cini, Osimo
- Biblioteca Oliveriana, Pesaro
- Biblioteca San Giovanni, Pesaro
- Biblioteca comunale Scipione Gentili, San Ginesio
- Biblioteca comunale di Sarnano, Sarnano
- Senigallia Public Library
- Biblioteca Filelfica, Tolentino

=== Lazio ===
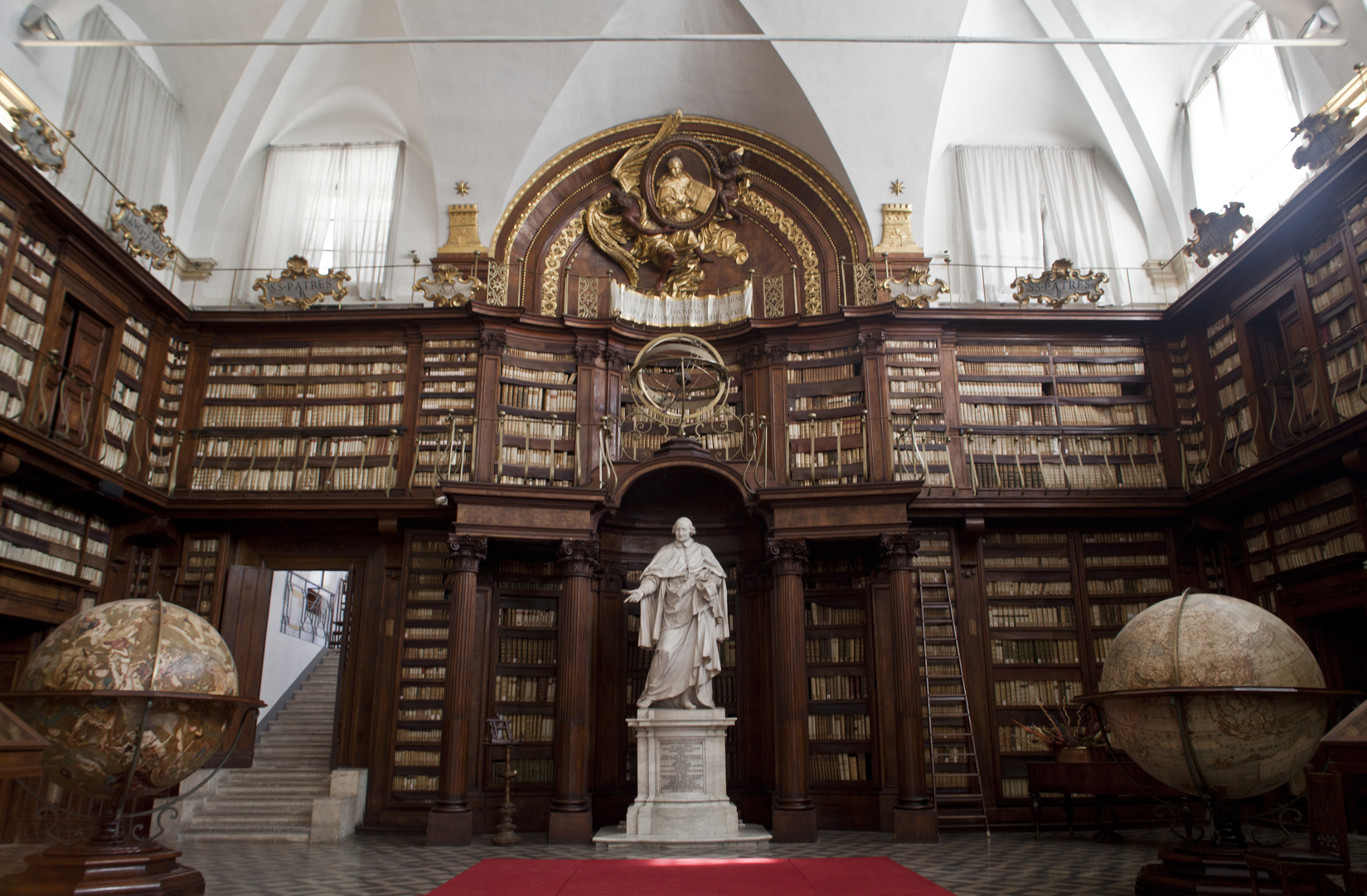
Biblioteca Casanatense, Lazio, Rome

- Biblioteca Angelica, Rome
- Biblioteca della Camera dei deputati, Rome
- Biblioteca del Senato, Rome
- Biblioteca della Comunità Israelitica, Rome
- Biblioteca Nazionale Centrale di Roma
- Biblioteca Vallicelliana, Rome
- Bibliotheca Hertziana – Max Planck Institute for Art History, Rome
- Biblioteca Casanatense, Rome
- Biblioteca dell'Accademia Nazionale dei Lincei e Corsiniana, Rome
- Biblioteca di archeologia e storia dell'arte, Rome
- Biblioteca militare centrale, Rome
- Biblioteca statale Antonio Baldini, Rome
- Biblioteca Don Bosco, Rome
- Biblioteca dell'Istituto dell'Enciclopedia Italiana, Rome
- Biblioteca medica statale, Rome
- Biblioteca del Ministero degli affari esteri, Rome
- Biblioteca e museo teatrale del Burcardo, Rome
- Biblioteca di papa Agapito I, Rome
- Biblioteca della Società Geografica Italiana, Rome
- Biblioteca di storia moderna e contemporanea, Rome
- David Lubin Memorial Library, Rome
- Fondazione Luigi Einaudi, Rome
- Forestry Information Centre, Rome
- Library of Palatine Apollo, Rome
- Palazzo Mattei Caetani, Rome
- Pontifical Biblical Institute Library, Rome
- Ulpian Library, Rome
- Vatican Library, Rome
- Biblioteca comunale Augusto Tersenghi, Velletri
- Biblioteca Giovardiana, Veroli

=== Tuscany ===
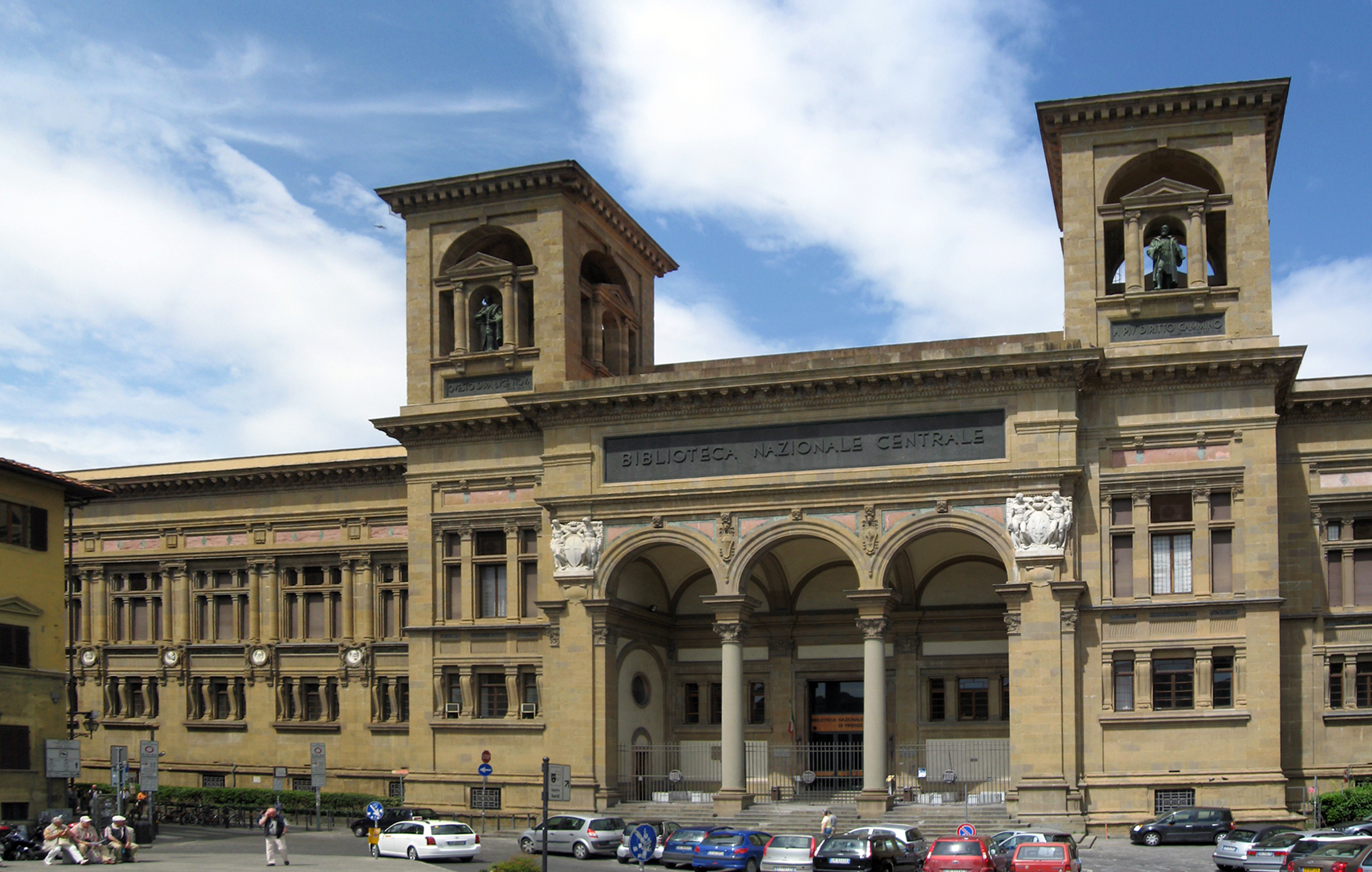
National Central Library, Tuscany, Florence

- Biblioteca comunale di Anghiari
- Biblioteca dell'Eremo di Camaldoli, Camaldoli
- Biblioteca Michelangiolesca, Caprese Michelangelo
- Biblioteca Vallesiana, Castelfiorentino
- Biblioteca comunale di Chiusi
- Diocesan Seminary of Fiesole
- Biblioteca Franco Serantini, Ghezzano
- Accademia dei Georgofili, Florence
- National Central Library, Florence
- Laurentian Library, Florence
- Biblioteca Riccardiana, Florence
- Biblioteca e Archivio del Risorgimento, Florence
- Biblioteca Marucelliana, Florence
- Biblioteca Moreniana, Florence
- British Institute of Florence
- European University Institute Library, Florence
- Gabinetto Vieusseux, Florence
- Kunsthistorisches Institut in Florenz, Florence
- Biblioteca delle Oblate, Florence
- Villa I Tatti, Florence
- Biblioteca dell'Accademia della Crusca, Florence
- Biblioteca degli Uffizi, Florence
- Biblioteca dell'Orticoltura, Florence
- Biblioteca di Villa Bandini, Florence
- Biblioteca Palatina Mediceo Lotaringia, Florence
- Biblioteca comunale centrale di Firenze
- Biblioteca Fabrizio De André, Florence
- Biblioteca Moreniana, Florence
- Biblioteca delle Oblate, Florence
- Biblioteca di Palagio di Parte Guelfa, Florence
- Biblioteca Palatina Lorenese, Florence
- Biblioteca Pietro Thouar, Florence
- Biblioteca della Ghisa, Follonica
- Biblioteca Chelliana, Grosseto
- Biblioteca Labronica F.D.Guerrazzi, Livorno
- Biblioteca Labronica, Livorno
- Biblioteca statale di Lucca
- Biblioteca del Seminario Arcivescovile di Lucca
- Biblioteca civica Agorà, Lucca
- Biblioteca Poggiana, Montevarchi
- National Esperanto Library and Archive, Massa
- Biblioteca Gaetano Badii, Massa Marittima
- Biblioteca e archivio Piero Calamandrei, Montepulciano
- Biblioteca Cathariniana, Pisa
- Domus Galilaeana, Pisa
- Biblioteca provinciale di Pisa
- Biblioteca Fabroniana, Pistoia
- Biblioteca Forteguerriana, Pistoia
- Biblioteca San Giorgio, Pistoia
- Biblioteca Lazzerini, Prato
- Biblioteca Roncioniana, Prato
- Biblioteca comunale di San Miniato
- Biblioteca comunale Dionisio Roberti, Sansepolcro
- Biblioteca Comunale degli Intronati, Siena
- Biblioteca Leonardiana, Vinci

=== Umbria ===
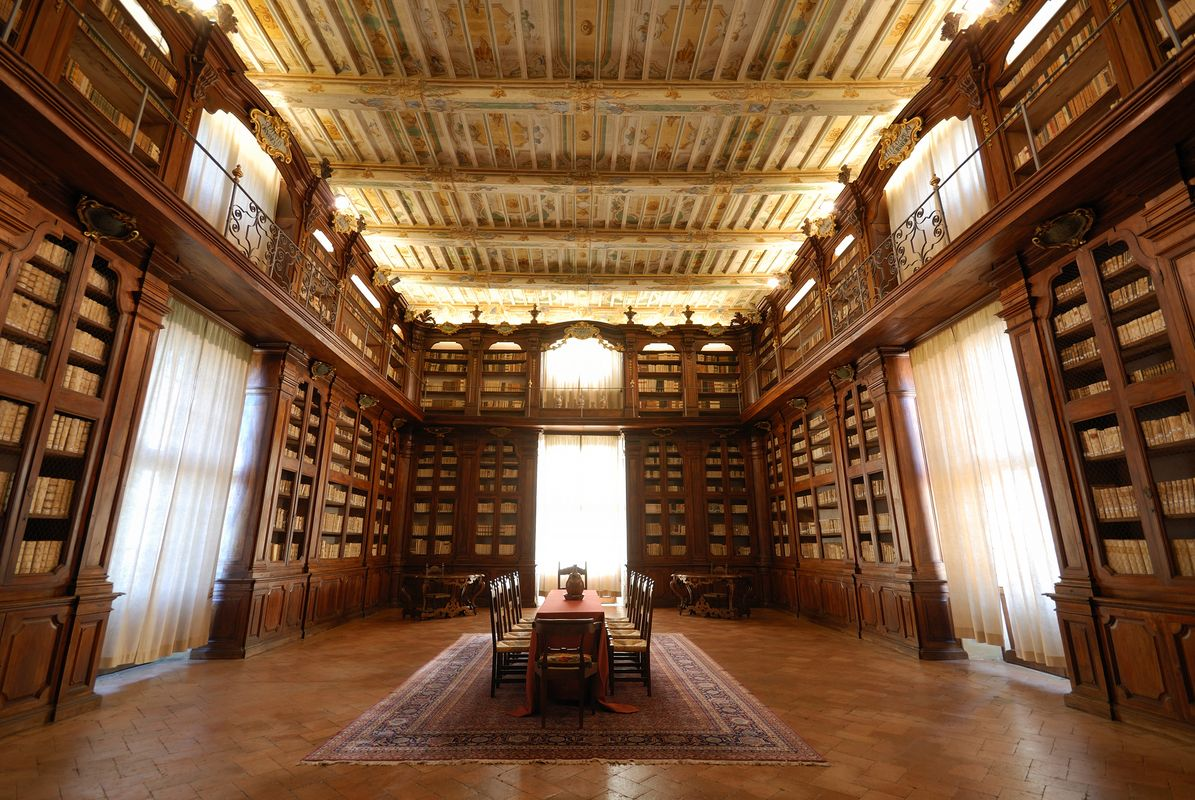
Biblioteca del Monte, Umbria, Perugia

- Biblioteca del Sacro Convento, Assisi
- Biblioteca diocesana Storti-Guerri, Città di Castello
- Biblioteca Comunale Sperelliana, Gubbio
- Biblioteca Augusta, Perugia
- Biblioteca del Monte, Perugia
- Biblioteca Giorgio Basili, Perugia
- Biblioteca delle Nuvole, Perugia
- Biblioteca Sandro Penna, Perugia
- Biblioteca San Matteo degli Armeni, Perugia
- Biblioteca Villa Urbani, Perugia
- Biblioteca comunale Biblionet, Ponte San Giovanni
- Biblioteca comunale Giosuè Carducci di Spoleto

== South ==
=== Abruzzo ===
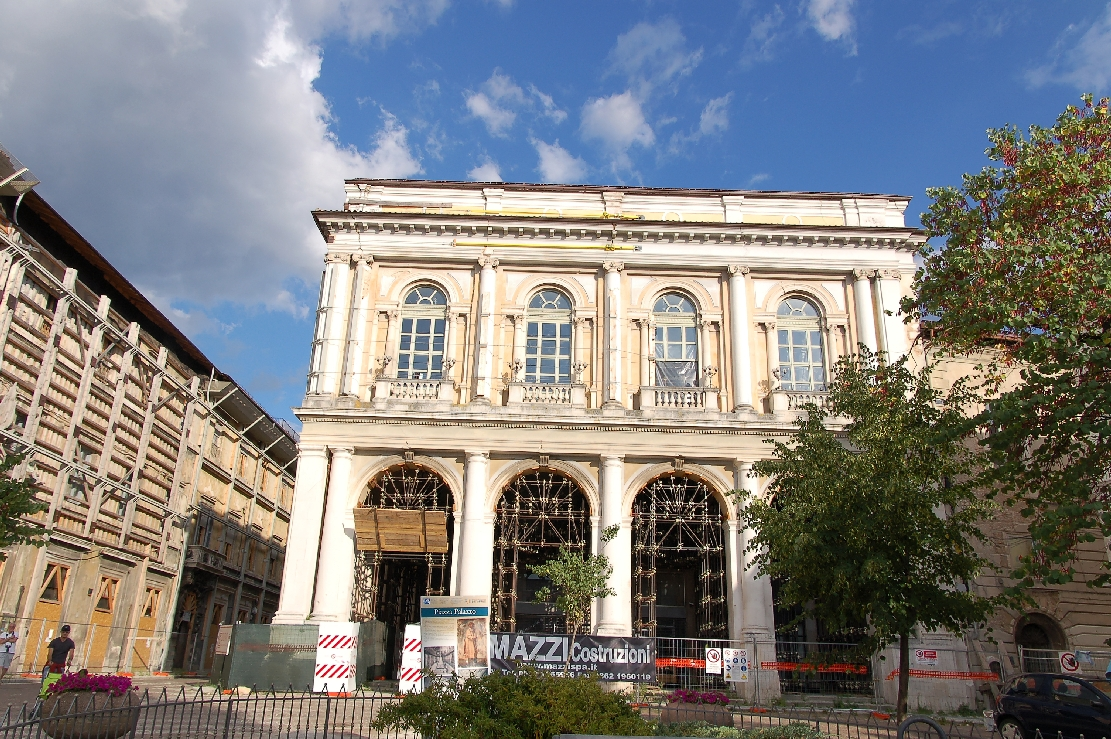
Biblioteca provinciale Salvatore Tommasi, Abruzzo, L'Aquila

See also: Libraries of Abruzzo (in Italian)

- Museo e biblioteca di Santa Maria Valleverde, Celano
- Biblioteca civica "Vincenzo Bindi", Giulianova
- Biblioteca provinciale Salvatore Tommasi, L'Aquila
- Biblioteca comunale Publio Ovidio Nasone, Sulmona
- Biblioteca regionale Melchiorre Delfico, Teramo

=== Apulia ===
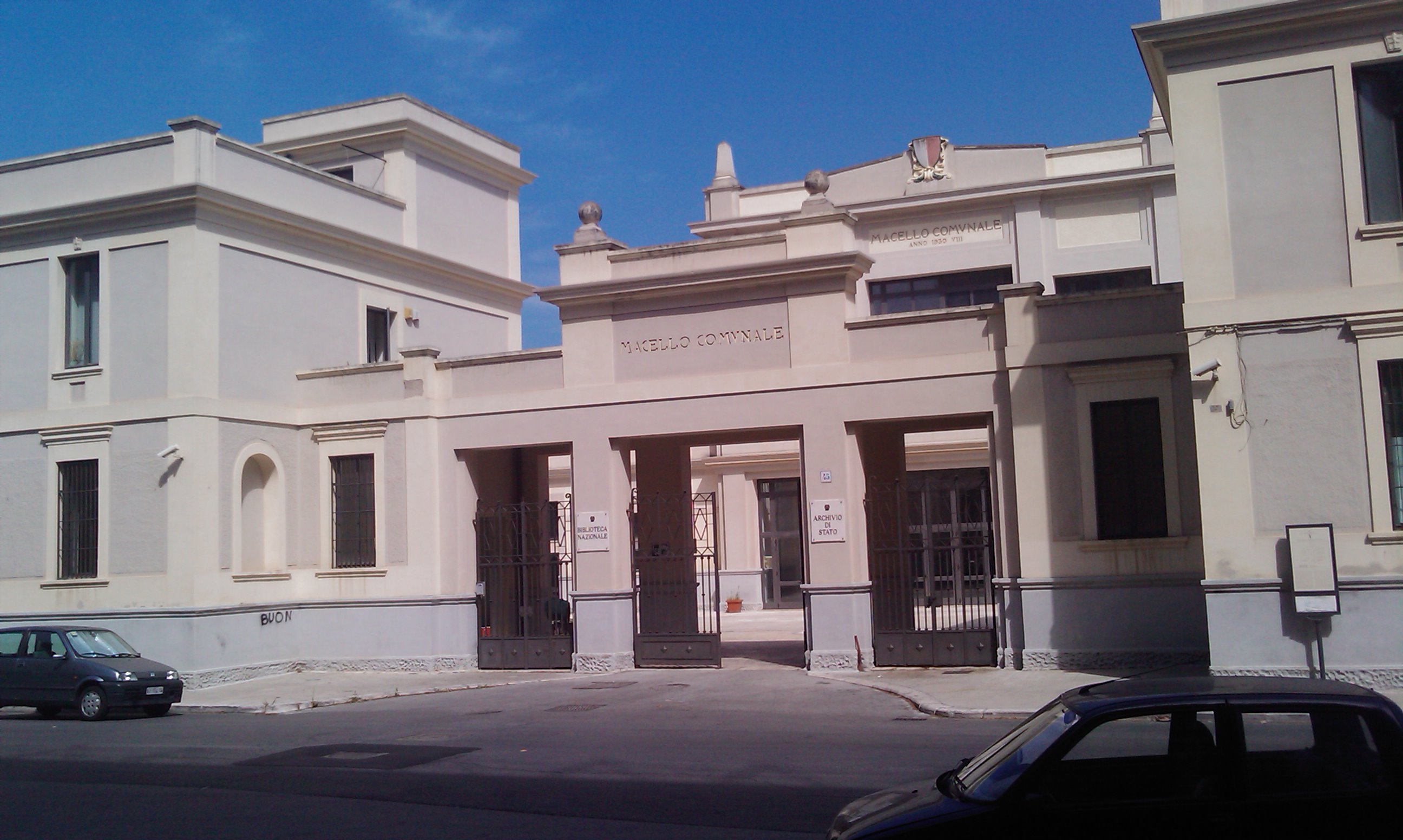
Biblioteca nazionale Sagarriga Visconti-Volpi, Apulia, Bari

- Altamura Diocesan Museum Matroneum
- Archivio Biblioteca Museo Civico, Altamura
- Biblioteca nazionale Sagarriga Visconti-Volpi, Bari
- Biblioteca Metropolitana S. Teresa dei Maschi de Gemmis, Bari
- Biblioteca comunale Sabino Loffredo, Barletta
- Biblioteca pubblica arcivescovile Annibale de Leo, Brindisi
- Biblioteca comunale don Vincenzo Angelillo, Gioia del Colle
- Biblioteca Comunale Francesco Piccinno, Maglie
- Biblioteca Padre Antonio Fania, San Marco in Lamis
- Biblioteca comunale Giovanni Bovio, Trani

=== Basilicata ===
- Biblioteca provinciale di Potenza
- Biblioteca provinciale Tommaso Stigliani, Matera
- Biblioteca nazionale di Potenza

=== Calabria ===
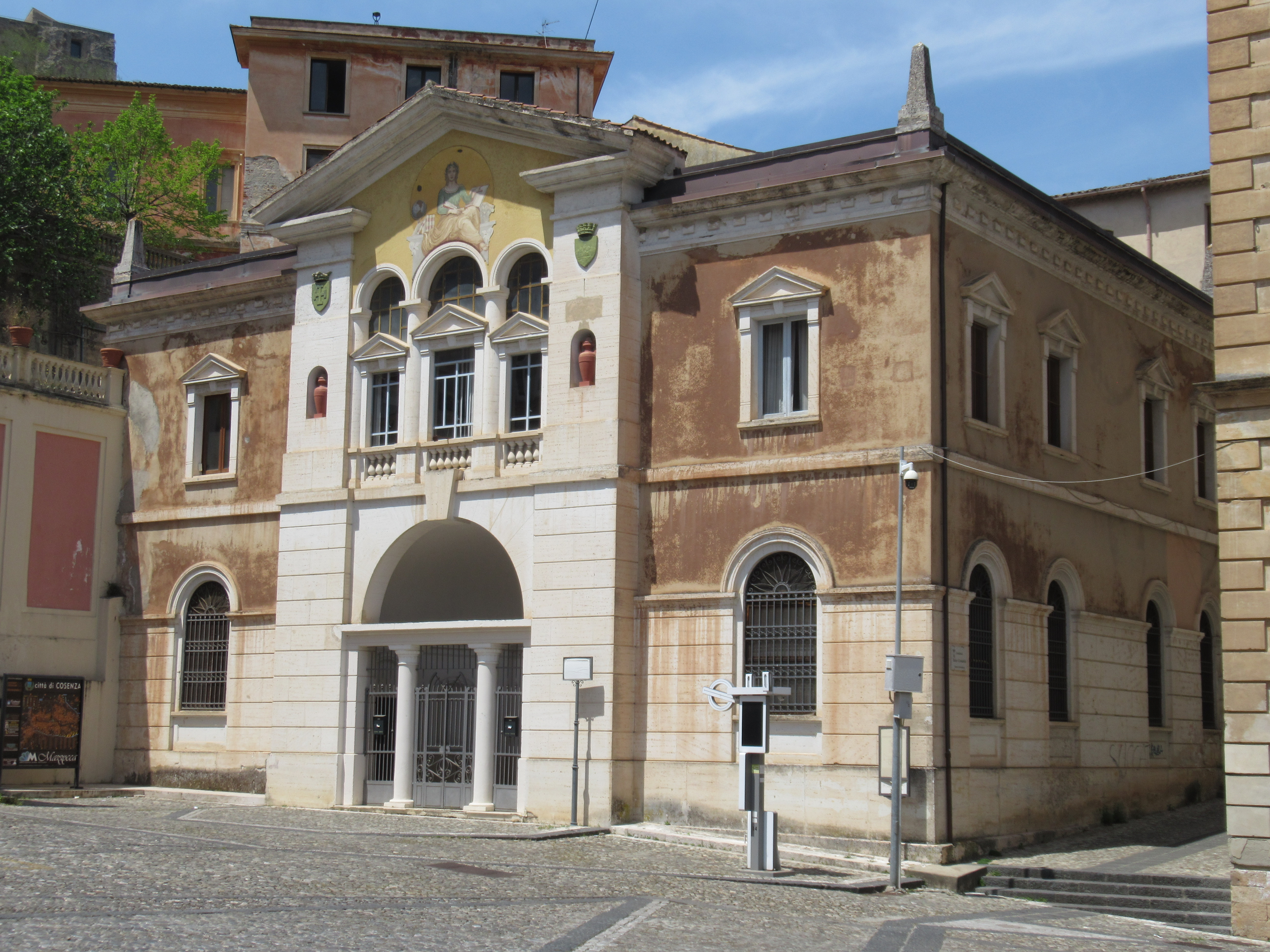
Biblioteca civica di Cosenza, Calabria, Catanzaro

- Biblioteca comunale Filippo De Nobili, Catanzaro
- Biblioteca provinciale Bruno Chimirri, Catanzaro
- Biblioteca civica di Cosenza
- Biblioteca nazionale di Cosenza
- Biblioteca "Pietro de Nava", Reggio Calabria
- Lamezia Terme Town Library
- Biblioteca comunale di Polistena
- Biblioteca calabrese, Soriano Calabro

=== Campania ===
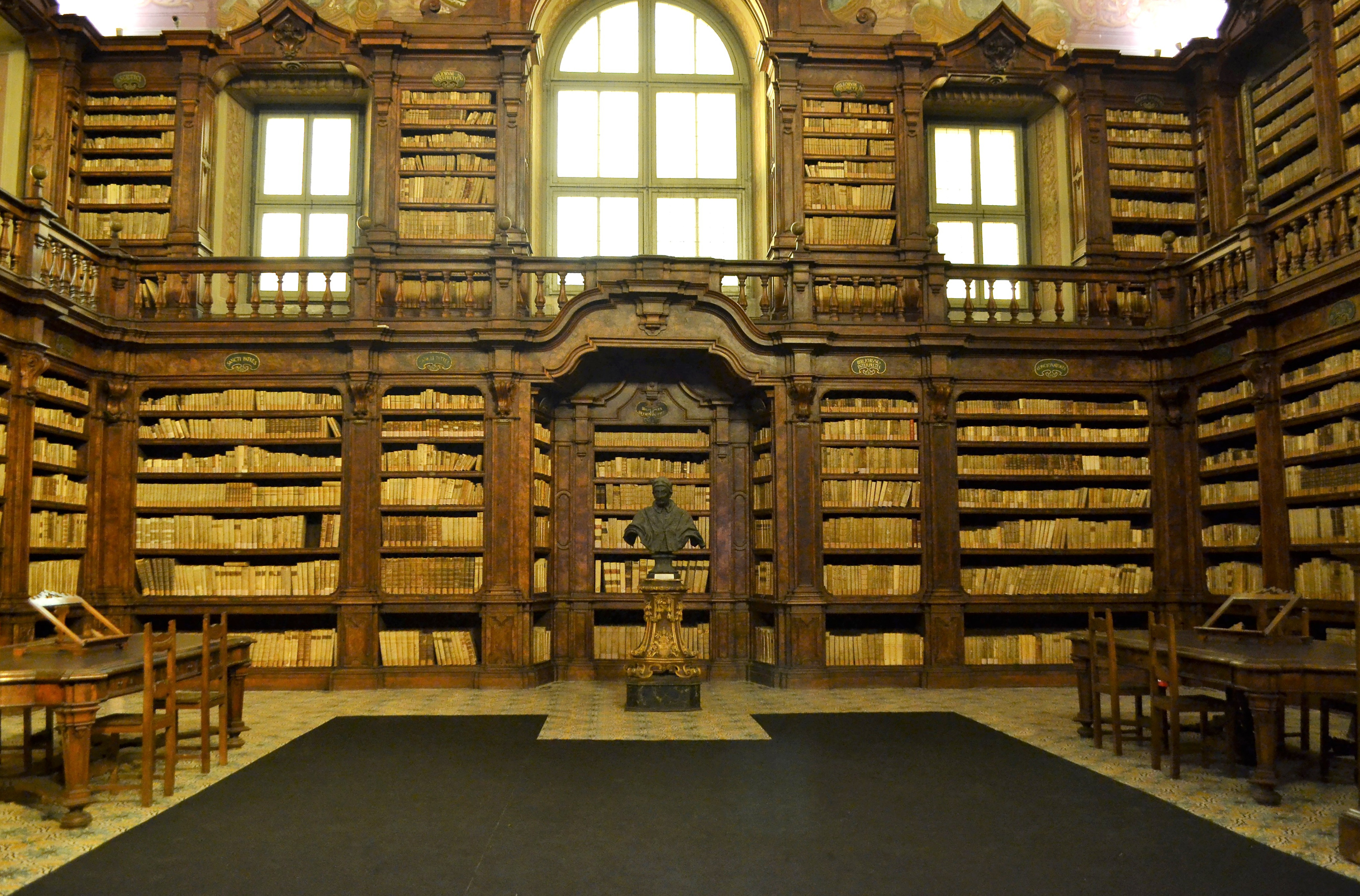
Biblioteca dei Girolamini, Campania, Naples

- Biblioteca del Convento di Sant'Antonio, Afragola
- Biblioteca civica Pasquale Stanislao Mancini, Ariano Irpino
- Biblioteca diocesana, Ariano Irpino)
- Biblioteca generalizia Filippo Tipaldi, Ariano Irpino
- Biblioteca arcivescovile Francesco Pacca, Benevento
- Biblioteca capitolare di Benevento, Benevento
- Biblioteca comunale popolare Luigi Bladier, Capri
- Biblioteca statale del Monumento Nazionale Badia di Cava, Cava de' Tirreni
- San Pietro Alli Marmi, Eboli
- Biblioteca territoriale diocesana di Montevergine, Mercogliano
- Biblioteca statale di Montevergine, Mercogliano
- Biblioteca Nazionale Vittorio Emanuele III, Naples
- Biblioteca Digitale sulla Camorra e Cultura della Legalità, Naples
- Biblioteca Santa Maria della Stella in Napoli, Naples
- Biblioteca dei Girolamini, Naples
- Biblioteca Tarsia, Naples
- Biblioteca provinciale di Salerno

== Islands ==
=== Sardinia ===
- Biblioteca Catalana de l'Alguer, Alghero
- Biblioteca Metropolitana Emilio Lussu, Cagliari
- Biblioteca di Sardegna, Cargeghe

=== Sicily ===
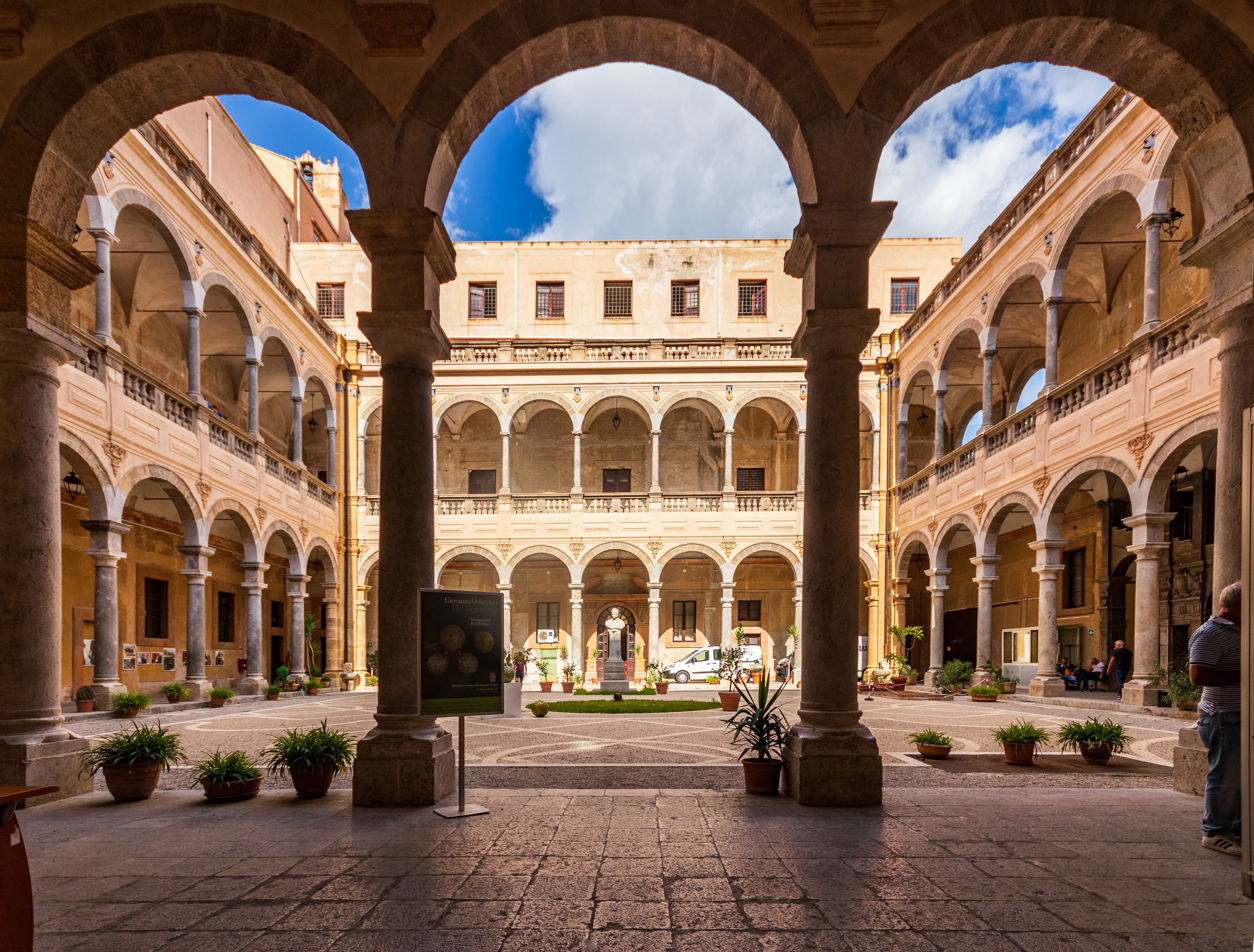
Biblioteca centrale della Regione Siciliana, Sicily, Palermo

- Pinacoteca Zelantea, Acireale
- Biblioteca Lucchesiana, Agrigento
- Biblioteca comunale Tommaso Bordonaro, Bolognetta
- Scarabelli library, Caltanissetta
- Biblioteca comunale Vincenzo Bellini, Catania
- Biblioteca della Città metropolitana di Catania, Catania
- Biblioteche riunite Civica e A. Ursino Recupero, Catania
- Biblioteca comunale di Gela
- Biblioteca centrale della Regione Siciliana, Palermo
- Sicilian Ethnographic Museum Giuseppe Pitrè, Palermo
- Biblioteca comunale di Casa Professa, Palermo
- Capuchin Friary, Sortino
- Biblioteca Liciniana, Termini Imerese
- Biblioteca Fardelliana, Trapani

== See also ==
- Associazione italiana biblioteche (est. 1930)
- Books in Italy
- History of Italian publishing (in Italian)
- List of archives in Italy
- List of largest libraries in Italy (in Italian)
- List of universities in Italy
- Open access in Italy

== Bibliography ==
in English

- Edward Edwards (1859), "Libraries of Italy", Memoirs of libraries: including a handbook of library economy, vol. 2, London: Trübner & Co., p. 349+ – via HathiTrust
- Savina A. Roxas (1975). "Libraries in Italy". In Allen Kent; et al. (eds.). Encyclopedia of Library and Information Science. Vol. 13. Marcel Dekker. pp. 122–139. ISBN 978-0-8247-2023-0.
- Elizabeth A. Dean (1983). "Organization of Italian Libraries from the Unification until 1940". Library Quarterly. doi:10.1086/601404.
- "Italy". World Guide to Libraries 2017. Vol. 1 (32nd ed.). Germany: De Gruyter Saur. 2017. ISBN 9783110517514 – via Internet Archive.

in Italian

- Ugo Costa (1937). Codice delle Biblioteche Italiane [Laws of Italian Libraries]. Mondadori.
- Notizie AIB [AIB News] (in Italian), Associazione Italiana Biblioteche, ISSN 0004-5934 1955-
  - Issues for 1992-2011
