= List of archives in Italy =

This is list of archives in Italy.

== Archives in Italy ==
- Vatican Apostolic Archive
- Central Archives of the State (Italy)
- State Archives of Italy
- List of State Archives of Italy
- Civic Archives in Bozen-Bolzano
- Audiovisual Archive of the Democratic and Labour Movement

== See also ==
- Associazione Nazionale Archivistica Italiana
- List of archives
- List of libraries in Italy
- List of museums in Italy
- Culture of Italy
- Open access in Italy
- Tabularium
