= Audiovisual Archive of the Democratic and Labour Movement =

Italian multimedia archive

Coordinates: 41°52′1″N 12°28′44″E

The Audiovisual Archive of the Democratic and Labor Movement Foundation (Italian: Fondazione Archivio Audiovisivo del Movimento Operaio e Democratico; AAMOD) is an Italian foundation that was created in 1979 and converted to a foundation in 1985. Its purpose is to research, collect, and store historical audiovisual documents, repertory, current affairs and narrative reconstruction. It works in the field of audiovisuals (cinema, TV, multimedia) to promote the construction of a collective memory of social movements and their protagonists. The foundation organizes research activities and sets up exhibitions on topics related to history and society, curating specialized publications. Its headquarters are in Rome.

The first president of the Foundation was Cesare Zavattini who held this role until his death in 1989.

The AAMOD was founded in 1979 as an association, with the name of the Historical Audiovisual Archive of the workers' movement (ASAMO), and inherits the film heritage of the PCI and Unitelefilm - film production company, linked to the PCI.

In 1983 the archive's heritage was declared of "considerable historical interest" by the Archives Superintendent for Lazio. It is the first Italian audiovisual archive, which thanks to the consistency and importance of its heritage, receives this notification. In 1985 the Archive was recognized as a foundation, for the need to better protect its heritage.

== Collections ==
The collections include:

- 7,000 hours of films, footage and documentaries
- 300,000 photographs
- 2,000 hours of sound, interviews, speeches and conferences

== See also ==
- List of film archives
- List of archives in Italy
