= Open access in Italy =

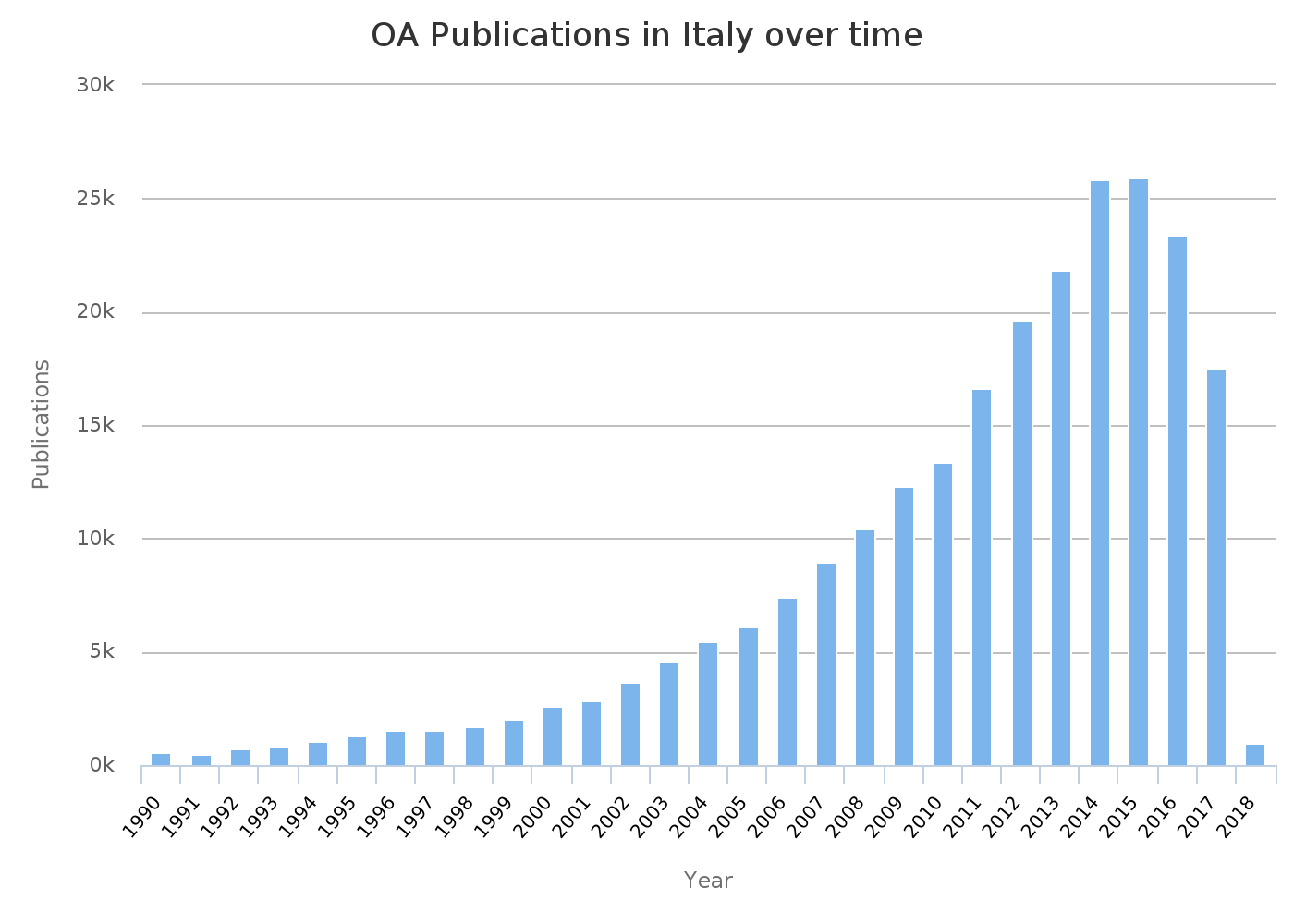
Growth of open access publications in Italy, 1990-2018

Open access to scholarly communication in Italy has grown since the early 2000s. During an academic conference in Messina in November 2004, Italian universities joined the Berlin Declaration on Open Access to Knowledge in the Sciences and Humanities, in Italy thereafter known as the "Declaration of Messina".

== Timeline ==
- 2004
  - "Messina open access declaration issued."
  - "PLEIADI (Portal for Italian Electronic Scholarly Literature in Institutional Archives) was developed and implemented by the interuniversity supercomputing consortia CASPUR and CILEA... to provide a national platform to access digital contents deposited in the Italian open archives."
- 2006
  - "Conference of Italian Universities Rectors (CRUI) established a working group on open access" (OAWG).
- 2013
  - 7 October: Law effected requiring "results of research, funded at least 50% with public funds and published in scholarly journals (whose frequency is at least biannual) should be open access."
- 2015
  - March: Associazione Italiana per la promozione della Scienza Aperta founded to promote open science.
- 2019
  - The Ministry of Education, University and Research drafts a policy combining evaluation of grants to research institutions with a requirement to publish research outputs in open access mode.

== See also ==
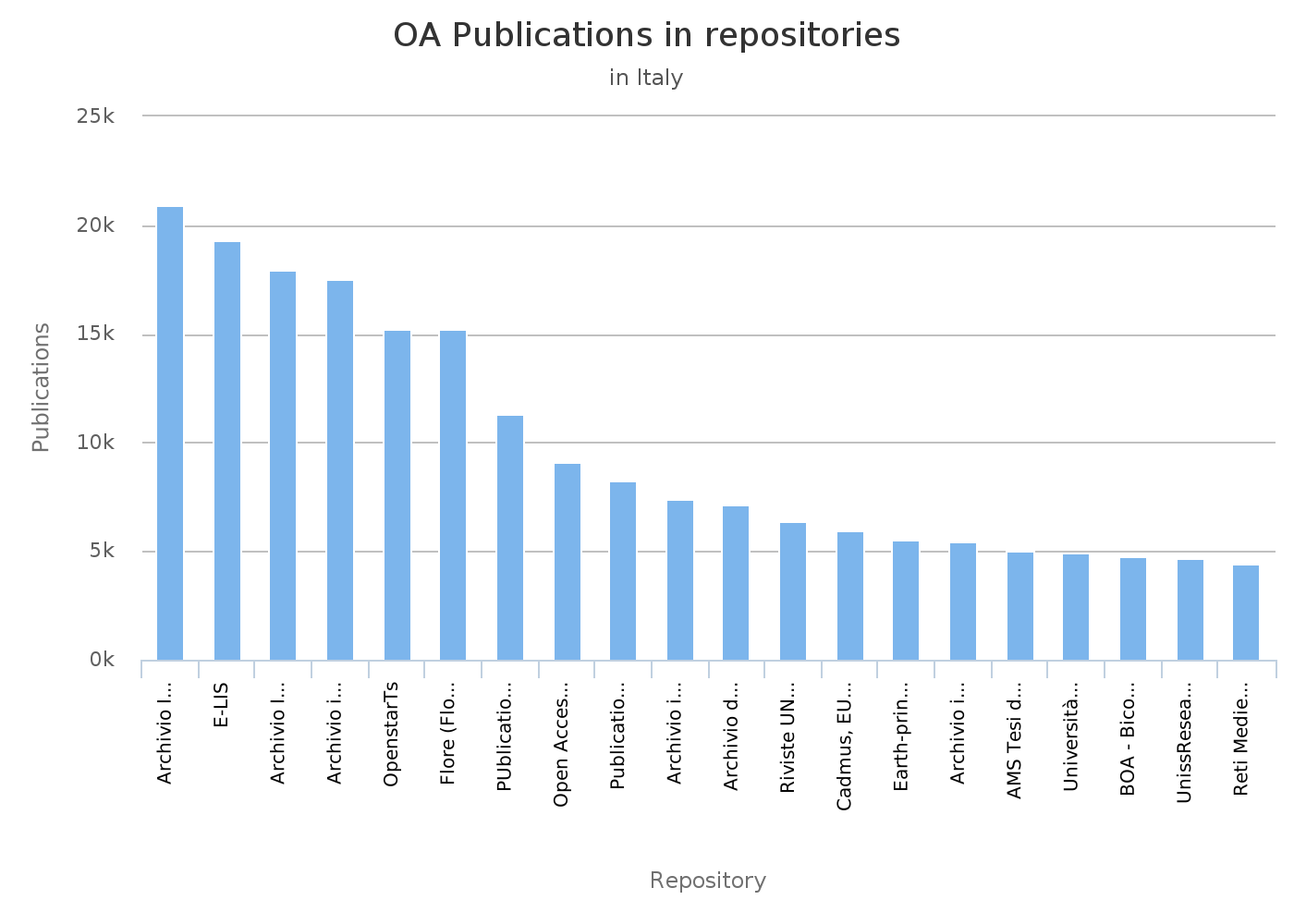
Number of open access publications in various Italian repositories, 2018

- Internet in Italy
- Education in Italy
- Media of Italy
- Copyright law of Italy
- List of libraries in Italy
- Science and technology in Italy
- Open access in other countries
