= Biblioteca comunale Luciano Benincasa =

Coordinates: 43°37′11.05″N 13°30′45.42″E

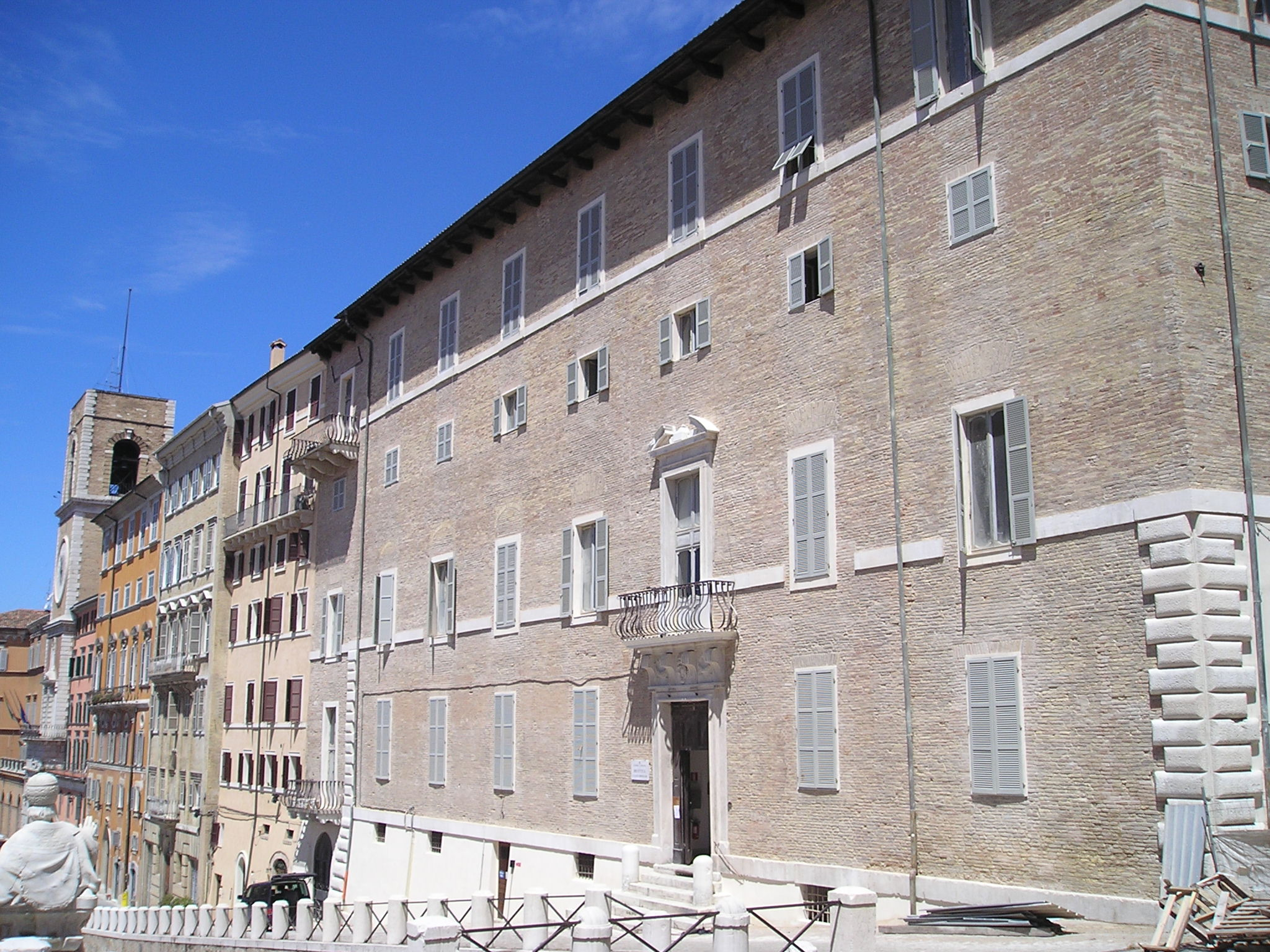
Palazzo Mengoni-Ferretti

The Biblioteca comunale Luciano Benincasa (the "Luciano Benincasa Municipal Library") is located in Ancona, Italy, in the Palazzo Mengoni-Ferretti, at the central Piazza del Plebiscito (Plebiscite Square).

== History ==
The library was established by bequest of Luciano Benincasa in 1669, whose will states that his private collection is to be made accessible to public use. In 1749, Eleonora Vincenzi gave the library to the municipality of Ancona, and it was moved from the palace of the Benincasa family to the Palace of the Elders. After 1800, the provincial archive was established in Ancona. In 1861, because of French rule over the city, the religious orders were suppressed, and their book collections were transferred to the municipal library; as a result the library collections significantly increased. In 1883 the library was moved to Carlo Rinaldini High School–Gymnasium. In 1911 the historical archive was merged with that of the municipality, and in 1925 moved again to the former convent of San Francesco delle Scale. During World War II, the convent of San Francesco was destroyed as a result of British bombing (1943/1944), and the historical collections – with their nineteenth-century inventories – suffered serious damage. After the war the city bought the Casa Mengoni-Ferretti, and in 1950 the library was reopened in the new premises. The historical archive, first merged in 1971, was moved from the State archives.

== Collection ==
In 2007 the library collection has approximately 145,000 prints. Among the older works are 343 manuscripts, 62 incunabula (from the 15th century) and 2600 printed books from the 16th century. The collection also includes a Fondo Musicale with 241 musical manuscripts of more than 50 composers (among them Luigi Boccherini, Arcangelo Corelli, Joseph Haydn). The majority of musical works date from the second half of the 18th century and include 62 manuscripts with compositions of Giuseppe Tartini, 16 manuscripts with compositions of Emanuele Nappi, plus 40 compositions dated to 1644.

The library holds also various audio books for the blind.

== See also ==
- Biblioteca Comunale (Siena)
