= Biblioteca Comunale Mozzi Borgetti =

Coordinates: 43°17′55.68″N 13°27′04.32″E

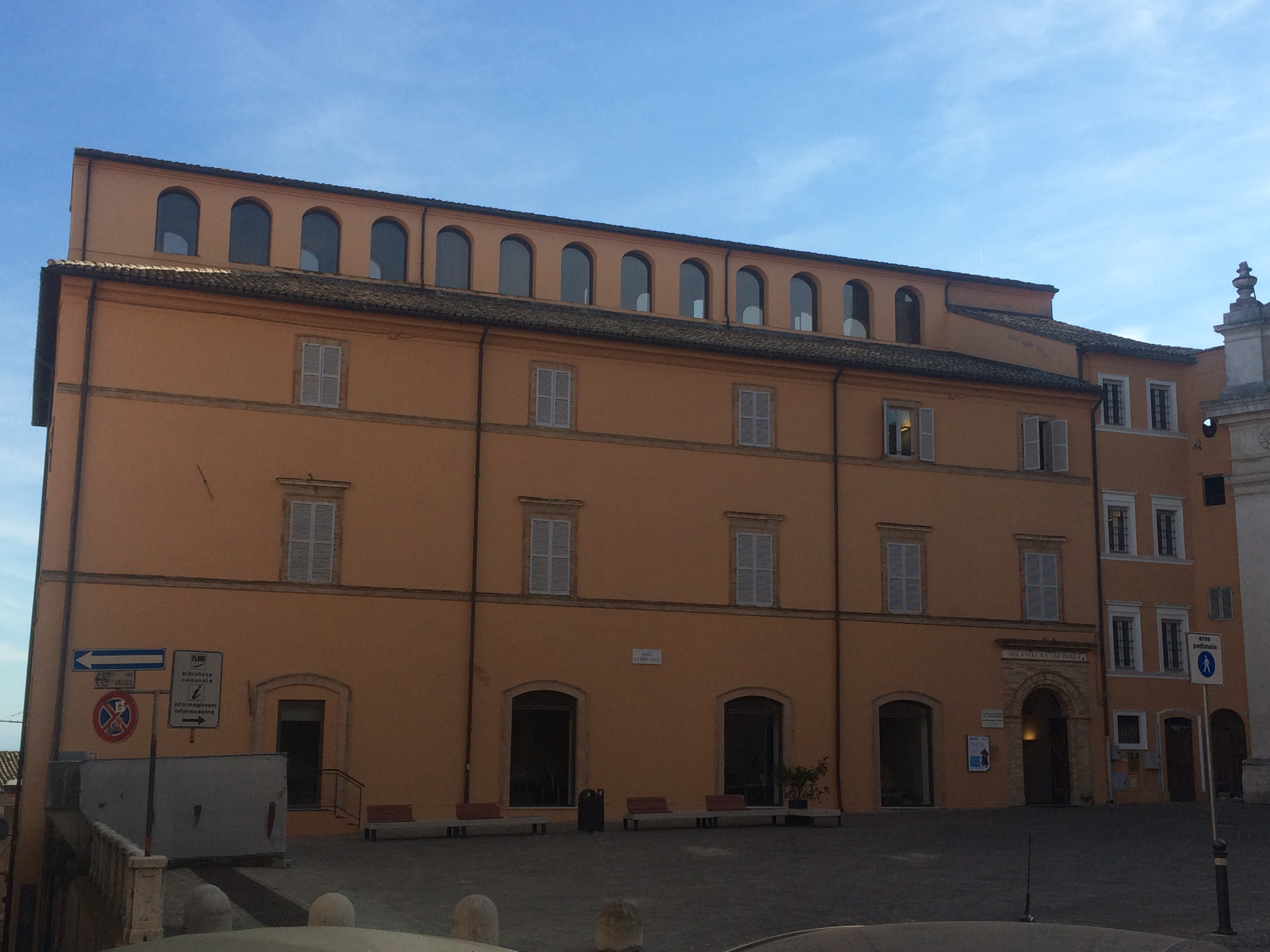
Facade of library building

The Biblioteca Comunale Mozzi Borgetti, founded in 1773, is the public library of Macerata, located on Piazza Vittorio Veneto 2 region of Marche, Italy. The name is sometimes hyphenated as Mozzi-Borgetti.

== History ==
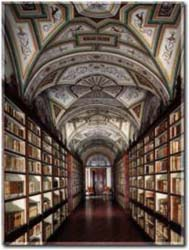
Frescoed gallery

The library was established in the building formerly belonging the Jesuit college in the town. The library was established upon suppression of the order, and had its nuclei in the Jesuit collection of 5000 volumes. The library was established with papal support (Clement XIV and Pius VI) and the patronage of Cardinal Guglielmo Pallotta. The library was open to the public in 1787.

The collection was augmented by the donations of the lawyer Rota Francesco Mornati, and by Bartolomeo Mozzi. In 1833, the Dominican priest Tommaso Borgetti donated his collection. The 19th-century art biographer, Amico Ricci, also endowed the library with his works and notes. With further ecclesiastical suppressions in the late 19th century, further collections were added. In 1935, it acquired the 20,000 volume library of the Castiglioni family of Cingoli (family of Pope Pius VIII), Also documents and books including: unpublished manuscripts of Abate Colucci, author of Antichità Picene; documents and letters of Luigi Lanzi, Diomede Pantaleoni, Giuseppe Neroni, Giuseppe Gioacchino Belli, and Giuseppe Radiciotti, the archives of Ireneo Aleandri, Giulio Natali, and document of Ricci Petrocchini family. In addition, the library has books from the personal library of Massimo D'Azeglio.

The site houses a gallery (sala degli Specchi) painted with grotteschi in the 18th century by Vincenzo Martini, Domenico Marzapani and Domenico Cervini.

Presently, the library has 350,000 volumes, including 10,000 manuscripts, 300 incunabula and 4000 16th century publications. In addition, the library has a musical and theater collection, and a collection of photographs, including 37 images, and 56,000 negatives.
