= Biblioteca Civica Girolamo Tartarotti =

Library in Rovereto, Italy

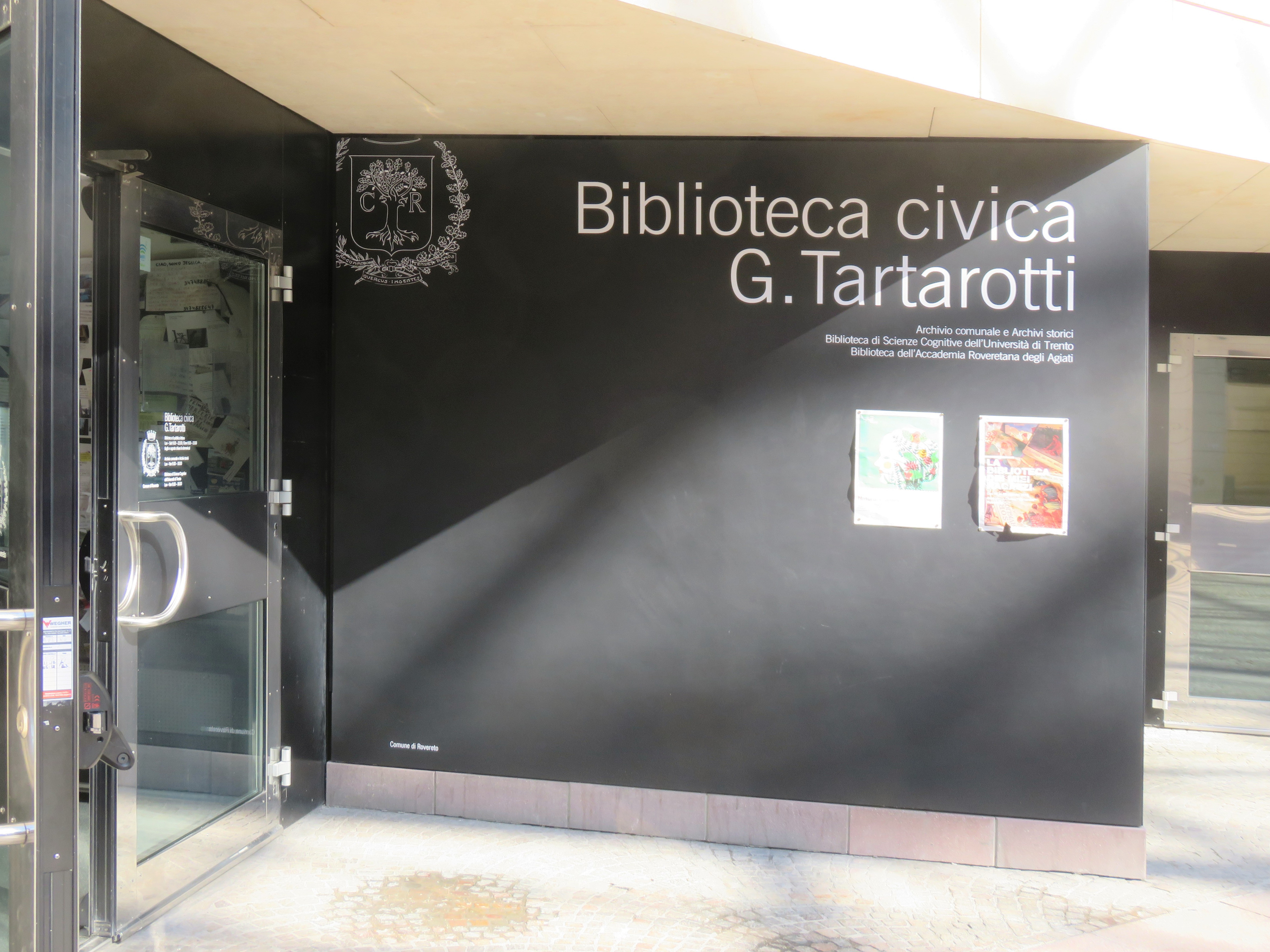
- Biblioteca civica G. Tartarotti, Rovereto - Ingresso principale 8
- 45.89437848956167°N 11.044538894010199°E
- Location: Rovereto, Italy
- Type: public library

Collection
- Size: 630,186 item (2019), 61,245 item (2019), 711,464 item (2020), 809,001 item (2021), 506,626 item, 472,009 volume, 67 item, 3,491 item

Other information
- Website: www.bibliotecacivica.rovereto.tn.it

The Biblioteca Civica Girolamo Tartarotti is the public library of Rovereto located on Corso Angelo Bettini #43, and forms part of the modern (2002) cultural center, including the Museum of Modern and Contemporary Art of Trento and Rovereto or MART, built adjacent to the 18th-century Palazzo Annona in the town of Rovereto, region of Trentino-Alto Adige, Italy.

== History ==
The library is named after the local 18th-century polymath and author, Girolamo Tartarotti (1706 – 1761). His will left his library to the local Charity Hospital, in hopes of becoming the start of a communal collection. A few years later, in 1764, the city purchased the collection, and created a public library, with the help of the local academic society (l'Accademia degli Agiati). Enlarging the collections over the years, in 1852, the library was moved from small quarters in the town center at vicolo San Giuseppe, to the Palazzo Piamarta across the Corso Bettini from the Palazzo Annona. In 1921, they were moved to the Palazzo Annona. Now the facilities mainly occupy space within the large cultural complex behind the palace. The main reading room was located in the ground floor of the Palazzo Annona.

From 1997 until 2002, the Cultural Center of Rovereto was built; known as the MART, it comprises the Museum of Modern and Contemporary Art of Rovereto (MART), the Melotti Auditorium, and the library. The building was designed by Mario Botta. Restoration of the adjacent Palazzo Annona was completed in 2007. That palace had been designed in the mid-18th century by Ambrogio Rosmini.

== Collection ==
Over the years, the library acquired further collections and work till now it includes nearly 415,000 volumes; 8000 periodicals and journals; in additions to archives, manuscripts, and artworks such as photographs, drawings, prints, and maps. The library includes nearly 20,000 books and manuscripts dating to before 1820, including codices and incunables. Among the collections housed or catalogued are libraries or works of:

- Library of the Acccademia del Agiati and the Clerical library
- Collections of the Graser, Saibante, Bossi Fedrigotti, Stoffella, Zeni, Orsi, Salvotti, Sighele, Tacchi and Zenatti
- Rosmini collection
- Library of Mario Untersteiner
- Scipio Sighele (1868-1913)
- Gino Piccoli (1912-2001)
- Enrica Collotti Piscel (1930-2003)
- Fiammetta Salvotti (1957-2008)
- Claudio Gallo (1950-)
- Giuseppe Torta
- Mario Lambertini (Nizza, 1932)
- Fondazione "Francesco e Zaira Giulietti" for study of Stenography
