= Biblioteca Guarneriana =

Library in San Daniele del Friuli, Italy

Coordinates: 46.160°N 13.011°E

The Biblioteca Guarneriana is a public library founded by the mid-15th century and located in two buildings along the Via Roma in San Daniele del Friuli in Italy.

== History ==
The library had been founded by 1445 around the posthumous donation of 173 manuscripts by the vicar of Aquileia, Guarnerio d'Artegna. Some donations increased the collection over the centuries, but it was not until 1736 when Archbishop Giusto Fontanini endowed the library with his large collection of manuscripts and over 2000 books that the local council built a new home for the collection, including decorative shelving made of oak. The antique collections of the library, which is adjacent to the church of St Michael the Archangel, the principal church in San Daniele, includes 600 codices, 80 incunabula, and 700 books from the 16th century. A separate building, across Via Roma, holds the modern collections.
