= Pontifical Biblical Institute Library =

- Bibliotheca Pontificii Instituti Biblici
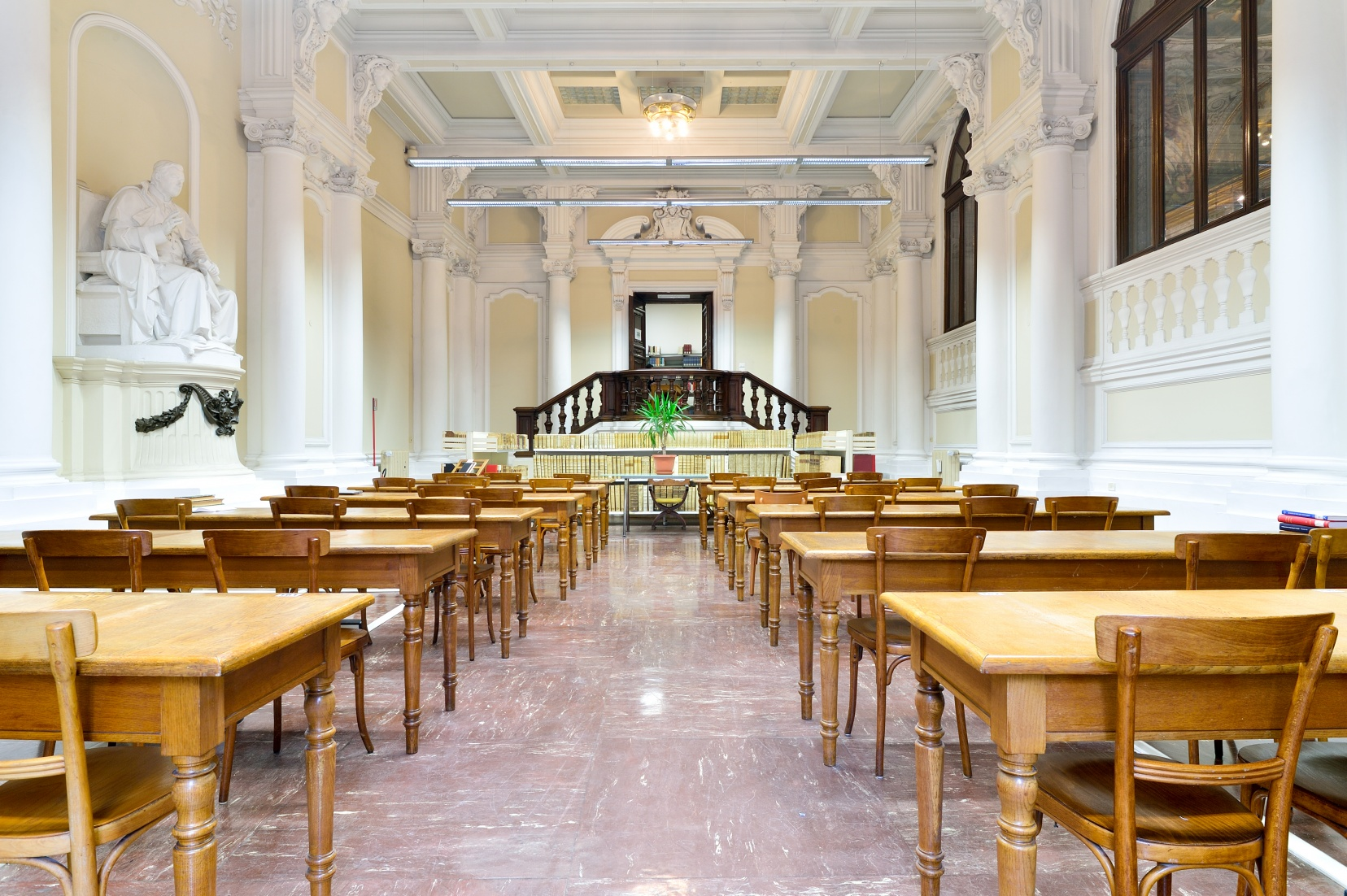
- 41°53′55.78″N 12°29′00.37″E
- Location: Italy
- Type: Pontifical University
- Established: 7 May 1909 (115 years ago) - Holy See

Collection
- Items collected: Over 187,00 volumes
- Size: 187,000 volume (2019), 184,099 item (2022), 40 item (2022)

Other information
- Parent organization: Pontifical Biblical Institute
- Website: biblioteca.biblico.it

The Pontifical Biblical Institute Library serves the scholars, faculty, and students of the Pontifical Biblical Institute (PBI). It is located in Piazza della Pilotta 35, Rome. The building was the former Palazzo Muti Papazzurri. The Library and the PBI have been part of the Gregorian Consortium since 1928 and have been included in the URBE network (Roman Union of Ecclesiastical Libraries; Italian: Unione Romana Biblioteche Ecclesiastiche) since 1991.

== History ==
The Library’s foundation coincided with the foundation of the PBI. On May 7, 1909, with the apostolic letter Vinea Electa, Pope Pius X endorsed the establishment of a biblical library that would contain past and present scholarly works necessary for the genuine development of Biblical Studies within the Catholic tradition.

=== Growth of the library ===
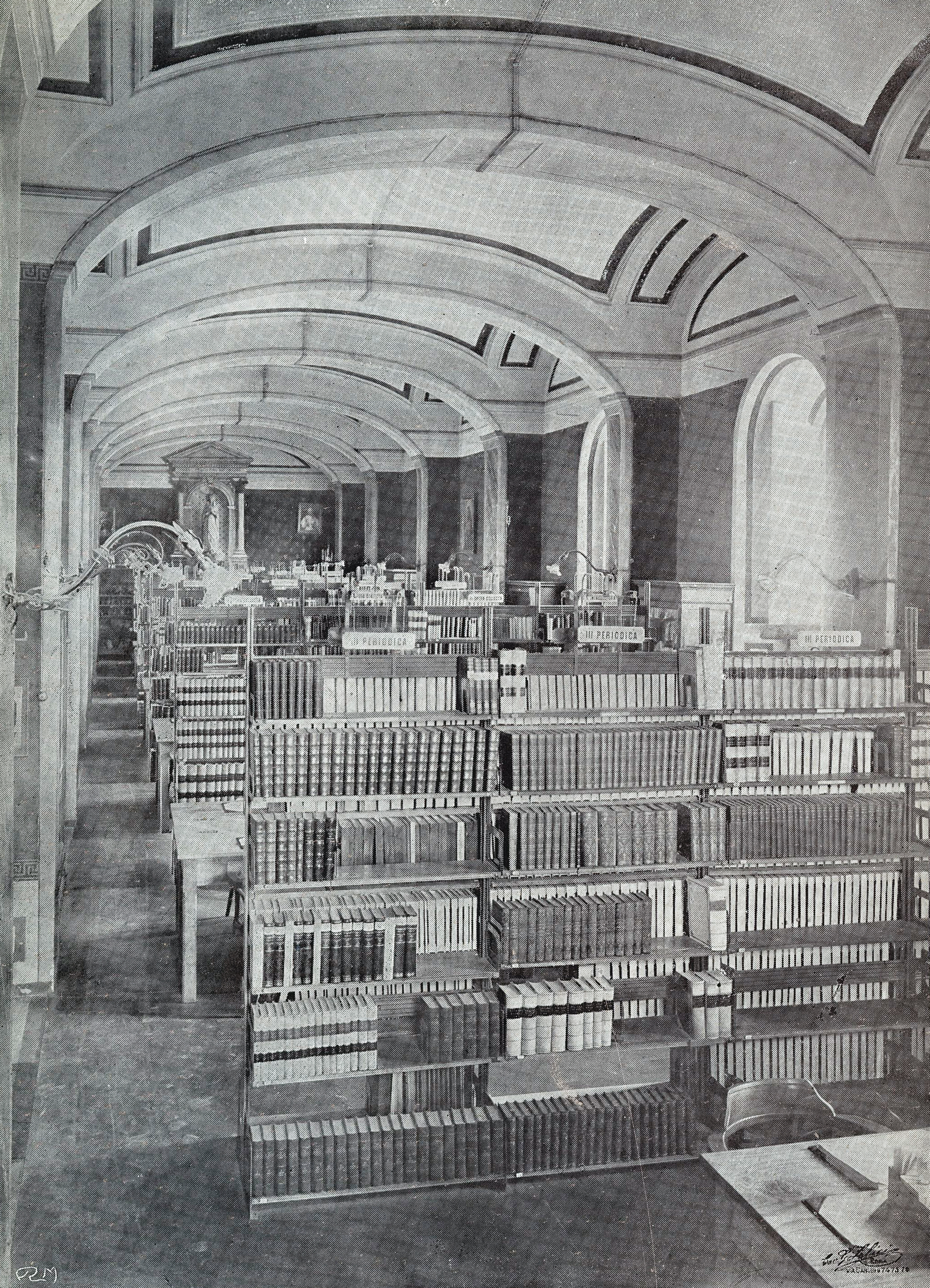
The Library’s first location at Collegio Leoniano, Rome, in the years 1909-1910

The first location of the Library was at Collegio Leoniano, Rome, in the years 1909-1910. From the very beginning of the PBI's existence, the Society of Jesus was fully committed to provide funding for the Library in order to acquire everything that it needed. Shelving units were installed first, followed by a core collection of books from all over Europe. Many of these initial purchases were in German, as the rector, Fr. Leopold Fonck SJ, was German and was very devoted to German biblical scholarship. The first purchases were made prior to October 25, 1909, through the Bretschneider bookshop in Rome, and included the Patrologiae Cursus Completus (Latina and Graeca) of Fr. J.-P. Migne, the fifty-two volume set of the Corpus Scriptorum Ecclesiasticorum Latinorum, and, amongst hundreds of other works, commentaries on the Old and New Testaments by Karl Friedrich Keil and Franz Delitzsch, respectively. Many more exceptional volumes were added to the Library the following year. On December 29, 1910, Fr. Fonck received a signed document from the Cardinal Secretary of State, Cardinal Rafael Merry del Val, granting him permission to borrow a number of works from the Vatican Apostolic Library that Leo XIII had set aside for a future library dedicated to Biblical Studies. These acquisitions included contemporary archaeological studies of the Ancient Near East (especially Palestine and Assyria), a collection of various exegetical and oriental periodicals, and duplicates of books in the Vatican Library. These volumes, which remain the property of the Holy See, constitute the second important core collection of the Pontifical Biblical Institute Library. The Library continued to expand between 1909 and 1934 with donations from numerous benefactors, including the du Coëtlosquet family, the brothers Augustin and Joseph Lémann, and Joseph Markwart. The works received for book reviews for the journals Biblica and Orientalia further enlarged the collection. The generosity of the benefactors and supplemental funding from the Society of Jesus enabled the Library’s collection to be doubled by 1934 in comparison to 1914. In 1934, the rector of the PBI, Fr. Augustin Bea SJ, reported that the Library had accumulated one hundred thousand volumes.

New acquisitions over the years made it necessary to create a special depository for old and rarely consulted volumes in 1970. The practice of transferring books to this new depository was sporadic until 1976, when Fr. Saverio Corradino SJ, began to send all works from the Library that were published before the 19th century to the depository. In 1992, the Library began to digitise the catalogue.

The library has also been enriched by the generosity of the professors of the PBI who have donated both rare and recent publications in the field of biblical studies. The entire collection now consists of more than 187,000 items.

=== Architecture of the library ===
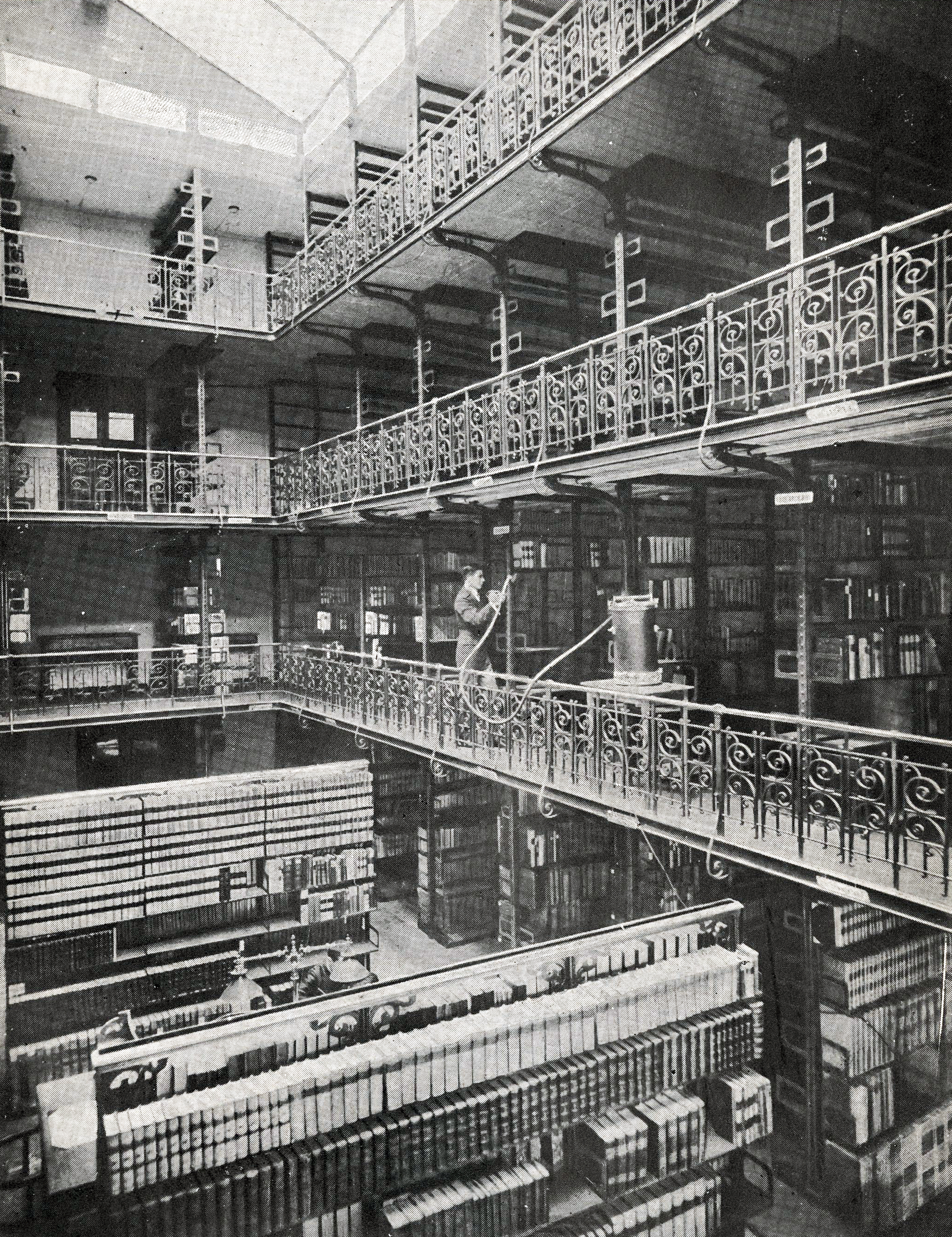
The Library’s Central Hall (Aula Centrale) at the PBI in 1911/1912

The Library moved from its first location at Leonian Apostolic College (Collegio Leoniano) to its present location in the summer of 1911. The Netter & Jacobi Company had modified the Palazzo Muti of the Marquises Papazzurri in 1910-1911. The architect, Hermann Joseph Hürth of Aachen, roofed over the courtyard of the palazzo, transforming it into the Great Hall (Aula Magna), which is now known as Aula Pio X. This structural enhancement enabled the Library to move from Collegio Leoniano to its current location. The four-story library was then built above the Great Hall and equipped with shelves from Art Nouveau.

=== Oriental Hall (Aula Orientalis) ===
The Library began an oriental collection in 1932 at the same time that the PBI created a second faculty dedicated to the study of the Ancient Near East. This collection, consisting of both monographs and periodicals, is rich in rare and respected publications related to the Egyptian and Mesopotamian worlds. In 1949, the oriental material was relocated to the southeast corner of the Library’s second floor, thus laying the groundwork for the Aula Orientalis. A major renovation took place between 1970 and 1975. In 1989, Fr. Pierre du Bourguet, SJ, the former director of the oriental section of the Louvre Museum, made a substantial donation from his Egyptian and Coptic collections. The Aula Orientalis presently occupies three rooms and contains approximately 12,500 volumes on Sumerology, Assyriology, Hittitology and Egyptology.

== Collections ==
The Pontifical Biblical Institute Library houses the following collections:

Kind of Material	Number	Period
Manuscripts	41	
Incunabula	27	up to 1500
16th c.	924 bibliographical entries	from 1501 to 1600
17th c.	1690 bibliographical entries	from 1601 to 1700
18th c.	2414 bibliographical entries	from 1701 to 1800
Modern publications	Over 125,000 bibliographical entries	from 1801
Periodicals	Over 800 titles	

=== Some examples ===
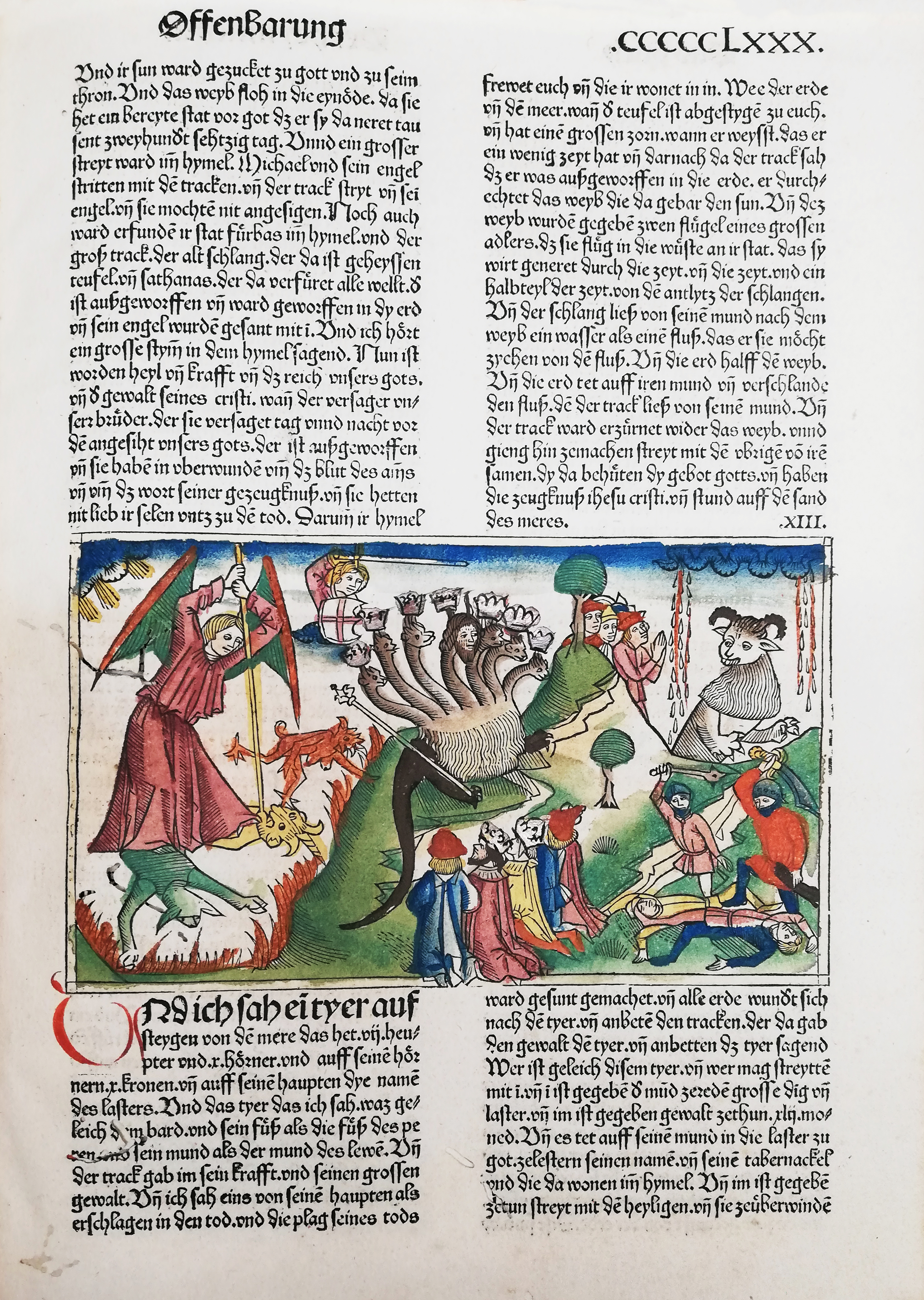
Koberger Bible, Nuremberg, 1483 – Book of Revelation

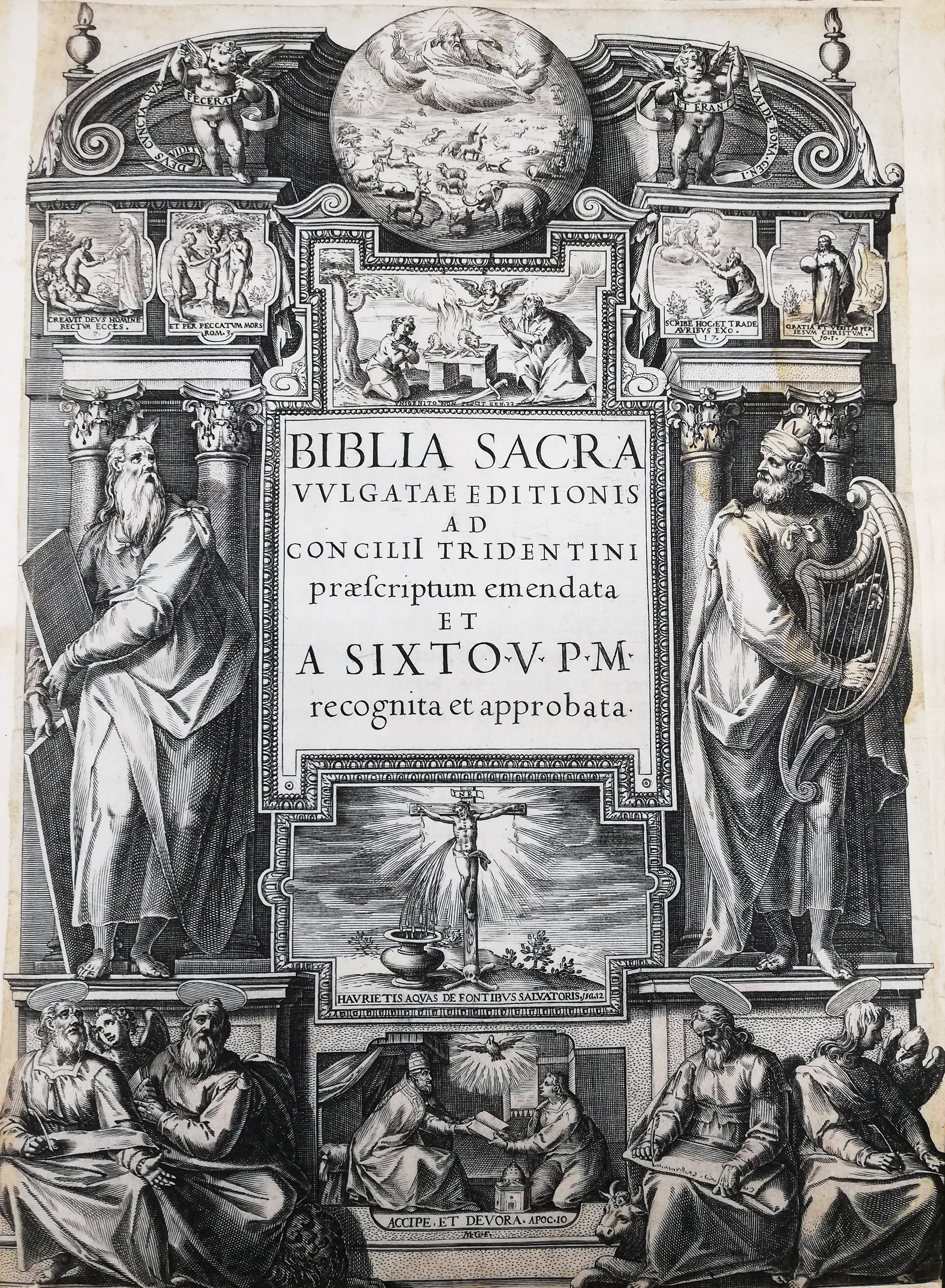
Sistine Vulgate Bible, Rome, 1590 – Front matter

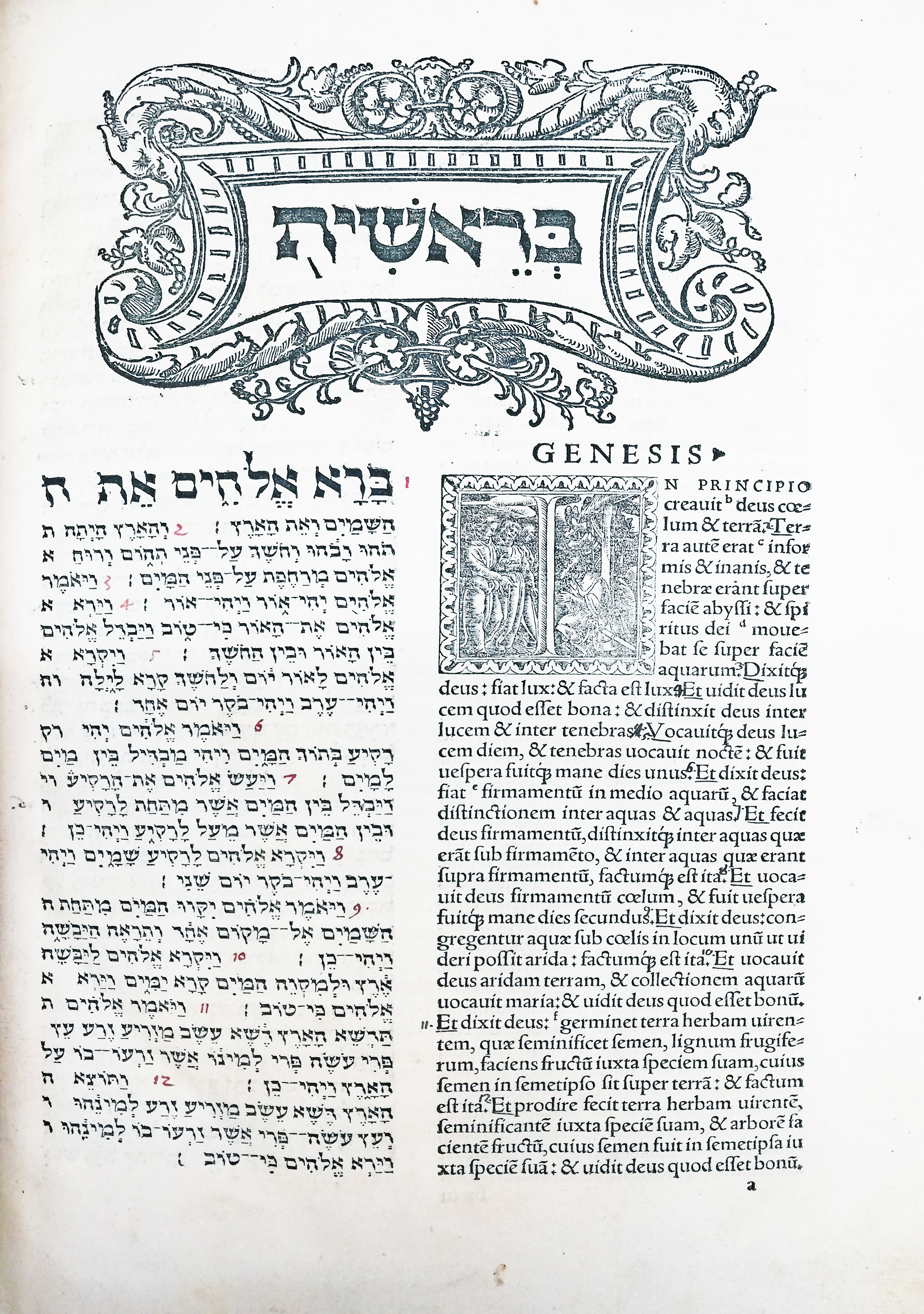
Münster Hebrew and Latin Bible, Basel, 1534-35 – Book of Genesis

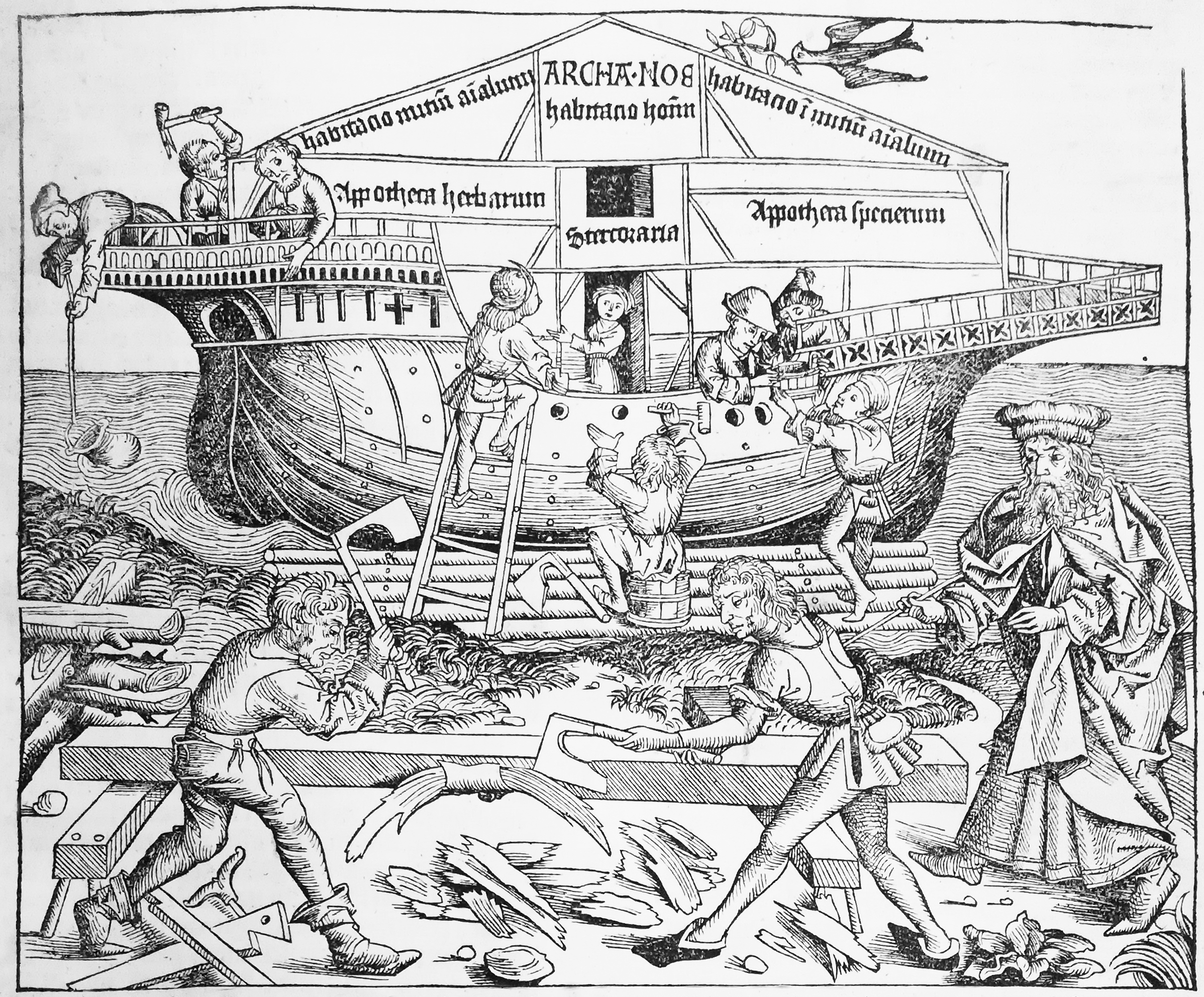
Nuremberg Chronicle, Nuremberg, 1493 – The Construction of Noah’s Arc (black and white version)

== Chronology of chief librarians ==
- Schellauf Joseph, S.J. († 1920) 1910–1915
- Fonck Leopold, S.J. († 1930) 1915–1923
- Vaccari Alberto, S.J. († 1965) 1923–1925
- Vilar Juan, S.J. (^) 1925–1927
- Da Fonseca, Luis Gonzaga, S.J. († 1963) 1927–1929
- Messina, Giuseppe, S.J. († 1951) 1929–1941
- Burgi, Emiliano, S.J. († 1969) 1941–1948
- Des Places, Édouard, S.J. († 2000) 1948–1966
- Mech, Paul, S.J. († 1999) 1966–1973
- Costelloe, Joseph M., S.J. († 2000) 1973–1975
- Corradino, Saverio, S.J. († 1997) 1975–1983
- Bertels, Henry J., S.J. († 2013) 1983–2002
- Dugan, James, S.J. 2002–2009
- Janddens, Jos, S.J. 2009–2015
- Wisniewski, P. Adam 2015–
