= International Library La Vigna =

Coordinates: 45°33′05″N 11°32′18″E

Biblioteca Internazionale La Vigna
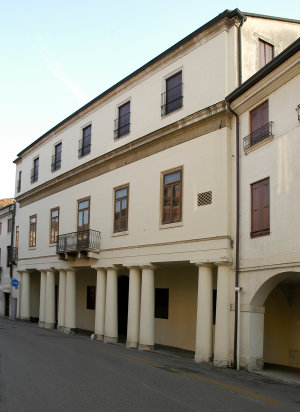
- Location: Vicenza, Italy
- Type: Public, International, Specialized library.
- Established: 1981

Collection
- Size: 56,712 item (2019), 58,606 item (2020), 59,661 item (2021), 78,532 item (2022), 59,494 volume, 3 item, 7 item (2019), 7 item (2022)

Other information
- Website: http://www.lavigna.it/

Centro di Cultura e Civiltà Contadina - Biblioteca Internazionale La Vigna is an institute of documentation specialised in studies concerning agriculture and wine. It is considered as the most important reference point for ampelographic research worldwide. It is situated in Vicenza in Contrà Porta Santa Croce n. 3 in Palazzo Brusarosco, then Galla. The palace is an eighteenth-century building, which was partially restored by the architect Carlo Scarpa.

== History of the institution ==
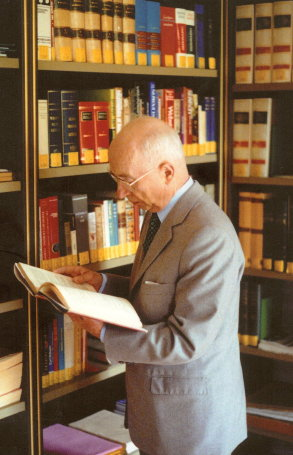
The establisher Demetrio Zaccaria.

“Centro di Cultura e Civiltà Contadina” - Biblioteca Internazionale “La Vigna” was established by Demetrio Zaccaria. He was an entrepreneur from Vicenza who began to get interested in the field after having read a book about oenology in New York City in 1951. It took twenty years to build an international library for researchers and connoisseurs. Dictionary of Wine by Frank Schoonmaker was the first book that was bought. Demetrio Zaccaria took part in international meetings, maintained important connections worldwide and started to buy ancient and rare books. Particularly important was the meeting with André Simon in London. André Simon, who was the founder of the International Wine and Food Society, author of important books about gastronomy and wine, as well as a leading figure in the Champagne commerce worldwide, became a model to follow for Demetrio Zaccaria. In the early seventies Zaccaria left Toscolano, on the Lake Garda, where he had lived since 1958, and moved permanently to Vicenza with his collection of books. In 1980 he bought Palazzo Brusarosco which is the base of the present library. The following year, when he was seventy, he donated the palace and his collection of almost 10.000 books to the “Comune di Vicenza”. He did this because he was worried about the future of his collection and also because he tried in vain to find another settlement. He became general secretary of “Centro di Cultura e Civiltà Contadina” and of the International Library “La Vigna”. Demetrio Zaccaria died in 1993 after having received important international recognitions.

== The base ==
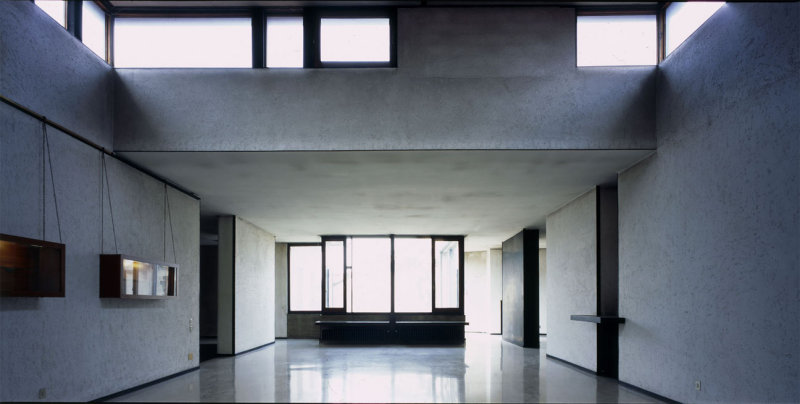
The second floor renovated by Carlo Scarpa.

“Centro di Cultura e Civiltà Contadina” and Biblioteca Internazionale “La Vigna” have their headquarters in Palazzo Brusarosco. The few information about the original building say that it was a house situated within the fifteenth-century Scaliger city walls. In the following centuries the house was time after time modified. In the eighteenth century the building was widened by Ottone Calderari. The new owner Orazio Brusarosco entrusted the architect Tommaso Becega the task of rebuilding the porch and facade in 1833. During the Second World War the building was hardly damaged because of the Anglo-American bombings. The lawyer from Vicenza Ettore Gallo bought the building in the early seventies. He assigned the renovations to the architect Carlo Scarpa. Then, he moved there his law firm and his house. On the second floor Scarpa planned the house for the family Gallo, converting the loft into a large flat. There he converged two themes he loved: the residence and the museum. The special features of the flat are fluent paths, smooth corners and the absence of doors. It is also lighted from natural, indirect and diaphanous light. Today this flat is mainly used for exhibitions and conferences. On the first floor, where the present library is based, Scarpa strengthened the ceiling of the living room and of the hall inserting girders. On the ground floor was built an independent flat that is now used as storage area of books.

== Collections ==
The current book collection is made of about 50.000 works, especially concerning agriculture, vineyard-growing, wine production, beekeeping, the production of olive oil and of honey and gastronomy treatises. The collection is constantly updated with new purchases, both of ancient and modern volumes. The ancient collection includes the most important editions of gastronomy that were published in Italy between the sixteenth and the seventeenth century. A peculiar example is De honesta voluptate by Platina (1530), which is considered as the first treatise of modern gastronomy. As regards the works about enology, the library keeps some editions of De naturali vinorum historia (1596) by the Roman doctor Andrea Bacci. The physical-philological-historic-medical-chemical treatise Ampelographia (1660) by the German doctor Philipp Jacob Sachs starts the collection of treatises about ampelography which make the library an international reference point in the field. The dithyrambic literature and poetry is an important part of the initial collection. The library holds 63 of the 82 known editions of Il Bacco in Toscana by Francesco Redi. Other collections, in addition to the original collection, have increased the patrimony of the library thanks to new purchases, both of ancient and modern volumes. The most important collections are:

- IRA Collection (Ispettorato Regionale per l’Agricoltura): it is the library of Comizi agrari-Dipartimento di Vicenza and successively of the Itinerant Chair of the province of Vicenza. This collection has been given by the Ispettorato Regionale dell'Agricoltura. It contains 2500 works that were printed between the end of the nineteenth and the beginning of the twentieth century. The works of this collection contain information about the story of the agrarian economy in Vicenza and in Veneto in the nineteenth and twentieth century.
- Fagiani Collection: this collection was given as a gift by Fernando Fagiani, a historian of the economic and social thought of the nineteenth and twentieth century. It is made up of 1100 books. These books deal with the agricultural history and economy not only in Italy, but also in Europe in the last centuries.
- Caproni Collection: the collection was bought by the heirs of Federico Caproni in 1997, who founded the Aeronautic Caproni Industries with his brother Gianni. It contains about 6500 volumes about the agricultural management and reclaims in the autarchic period. It is also made up of rare works about agricultural history: one important example is Della agricoltura by Rutilio Tauro Palladio which was published in Venice in 1528.
- Collection Galla: this collection was given as a gift by the lawyer Mariano Galla in 2007. It is made up of about 400 works – volumes and periodicals- about hunting that were published between the twentieth and the twenty-first century. You can find many books which describe the capture techniques of the game. There are hunting tales and diaries, precious illustrated books on birds (in particular on woodcocks), some manuals telling what to do to obtain the hunting licence and several encyclopedias. Del modo di piantare e custodire una ragnaja e di uccellare a ragna (1790) is the oldest work of the collection. This work was wrongly attributed to Bernardo Davanzati and was often published in his Opera Omnia. In reality this book was by G.A. Popoleschi, wo carefully described how to build and use this bird trap, which was probably invented in Florence in Tuscany.

== Cultural initiatives ==
In his notarial deed, Demetrio Zaccaria wanted the denomination “Centro di Cultura e Civiltà Contadina” to be used before “Biblioteca Internazionale “La Vigna”. This aimed to promote the initiatives of researchers and enthusiasts which increase the value of the collection of the library. The specific cultural activities, whose projects have been even more elaborate and qualified, are planned and carried out thanks to the contribution of “Consiglio Scientifico”, in collaboration with hosted or external associations as “CRA”, “ Centro di Ricerca per la Viticoltura di Conegliano”, “ Istituto di Genetica e Sperimentazione Agraria “N. Strampelli”” of Lonigo, “ Fondazione Masi”, “AIS Veneto” (Associazione Italiana Sommeliers), local consortiums for the conservation of DOC wines, “FAI”, “Club Lions”, Rotarys from Vicenza, “Associazione Italiana Cultura del Tè”, “Confraternita della Vite e del Vino del Veneto Orientale e del Friuli-Venezia Giulia” and so on.

This cultural centre has also started the initiative “Amici de La Vigna” in order to support its cultural and institutional activities.

== Hosted associations ==
The institution hosts the following associations which are engaged upon gastronomic culture and environmental conservation:

- Accademia internazionale “La donna e il vino”
- Associazione “Amici dei Parchi”
- Accademia italiana “La vite e il vino”
- Accademia italiana della cucina – Sezione di Vicenza
- Gruppo micologico Bresadola – Vicenza
- Convivium Slow Food del Vicentino
