= Biblioteca Civica Bertoliana =

Public library in Vicenza, Italy

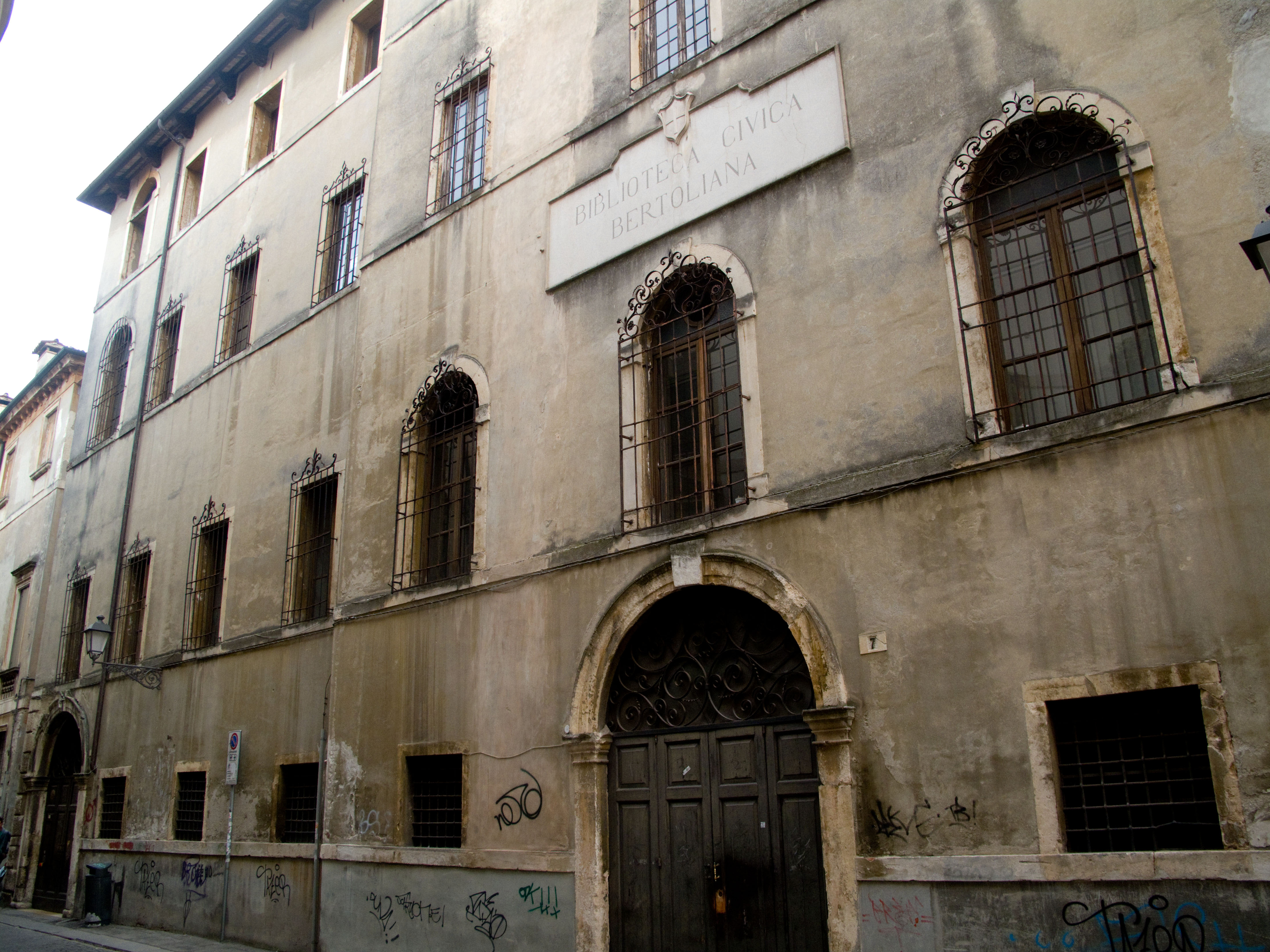
- 45°32′54″N 11°32′40″E
- Established: 1708

Collection
- Size: 550,981 item (2019), 3,619 item (2019), 373,956 item (2020), 393,440 item (2021), 403,365 item (2022), 4,070 item (2022), 330,400 volume

Other information
- Website: Official website

The Biblioteca Civica Bertoliana is a main public library of the municipality of Vicenza, Italy. Inaugurated at the dawn of the 18th-century, and now the third largest library in the Veneto, after the Biblioteca Marciana of Venice and the University of Padua library. The main office is located in the Palazzo San Giacomo, Vicenza.

== History ==
The library was formed from the donation of 9000 volumes in 1696 by the jurist and scholar Giovanni Maria Bertolo to the city of Vicenza, with the proviso could become public and provided with a home of "sufficient splendor". It was therefore decided by 1706 to place Bertolo's private library in the Palazzo del Monte di Pietà. In 1708, after the enlargement of the Palazzo by Francesco Muttoni, the library was opened to the public and entitled "Bertoliana" in honor of its original donor. The inventory of Bertolo's donation lists 8,701 works, of which 1,614 are of a legal nature.

Over the years there have been further donations and additions by purchase including the library of Fedele Lampertico (20,000 volumes). This expansion forced a need for a larger space, prompting a move to the former convent of San Giacomo, then belonging to the Somaschi order. The former convent was refurbished for this purpose by 1908 by the Engineer Dondi Dall'Orologio, and inaugurated on 23 January 1910.

The most difficult task for the library was to protect its most valuable holdings during the wars of the twentieth century. During the Second World War, books were hidden initially in Villa Camerini di Montruglio in Mossano and the Praglia Abbey in Teolo. After the armistice of September 8, 1943, the more valuable of the collections were hidden and walled up in the basement of the Sanctuary of Monte Berico in Verona, or other sites in Venice. In May 1945, the holdings began to be restored to the former convent of San Giacomo.

Further major refurbishments were pursued between 1950 and 1965. The library now contains approximately 450,000 volumes (200,000 of which were published between 1501 and 1830; some 750 large newspaper collections (173 periodicals and 145 publications together with Official Gazette of the Italian Republic and Regional Official Bulletin); and over 3000 manuscripts. It houses the municipal and many local family archives. It also contains the donations from 1924 to 1933, by the ambassador Lelio Bonin Longare of the archive and library of the Nievo family, rich in 16th century manuscripts and incunabulum.

== Other collections ==
- Library of Giovanni Checcozzi (1691–1756), 1,623 volumes including 426 folios and various incunaboli, (1776)
- Collections of Scientific papers by Filippo Neri donated by his brother Nereo. (1790)
- Collections of Carlo Todaro (580 volumes mainly German and French) (1790
- Collections of Paolina Porto Godi Bissari, 730 volumes including 6 incunaboli, among them editio princeps by Aristophanes, printed by Aldo Manuzio in 1498. (1826)
- Forty-nine engravings of the works of Andrea Palladio by Antonio Magrini, donated by the engraver and Maria Franceschini. 1872–1873
- Collection of marchese Lodovico Gonzati, 3,000 volumes and 7,000 opuscoli, mostly Vicentine authors.(1877)
- Collection of Francesco Molon, 879 volumes and 700 opuscoli. (1885)
- Library of Fedele Lampertico, 20,000 volumes and opuscoli. (1906)
- Collections of abbott Giacomo Zanella (1820–1888), donated by his brother Giuseppe, former mayor of the city. (1912)
- Collections of mons. Sebastiano Rumor, including letters by Zanella and writings by Antonio Fogazzaro, donated 1929.
- Collection of mons. Domenico Bortolan (1850–1928) donated 1930.
- Collection of Giovanni Scola, lawyer and local administrator. (2000–2005)
