= Portrait of Iseppo da Porto and his son Adriano =

Painting by Paolo Veronese

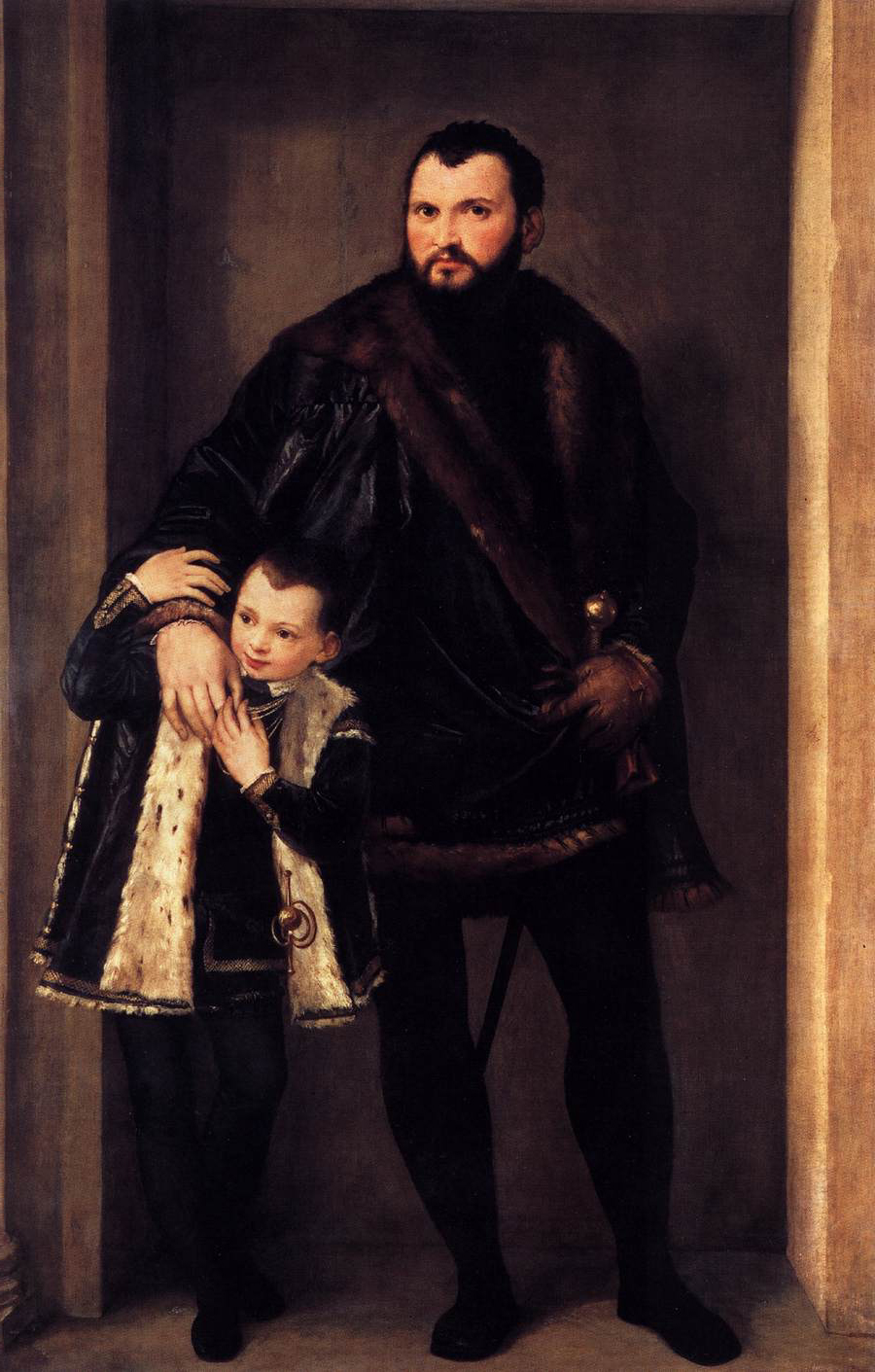
Portrait of Iseppo da Porto and his son Adriano (c. 1555) by Paolo Veronese

Portrait of Iseppo da Porto and his son Adriano is a c.1555 oil-on-canvas painting by the Italian Renaissance painter Paolo Veronese, now in the Contini Bonacossi collection, on long-term loan to the Uffizi in Florence. Veronese also decorated Porto's Palazzo Porto in Vicenza, designed by Andrea Palladio and completed in 1552.

It is a pendant to a portrait of Iseppo's wife Livia or Lucia Thien, who he married in 1545, and one of their daughters. It was acquired in Paris from the Sedelmeyer collection by Alessandro Contini Bonacossi, though its female pendant was by then in a private collection in Vicenza, from which it later passed to the Walters Art Museum in Baltimore.

== Additional images ==
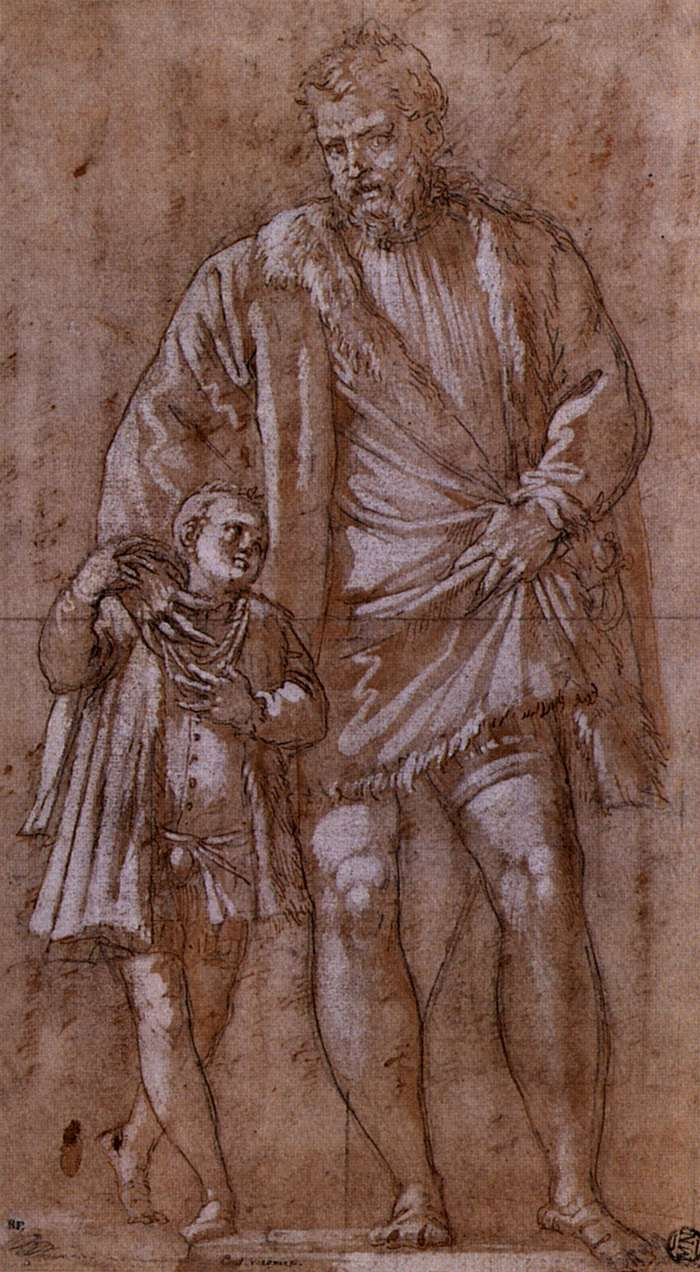
Preparatory drawing (Louvre, n. 4678)

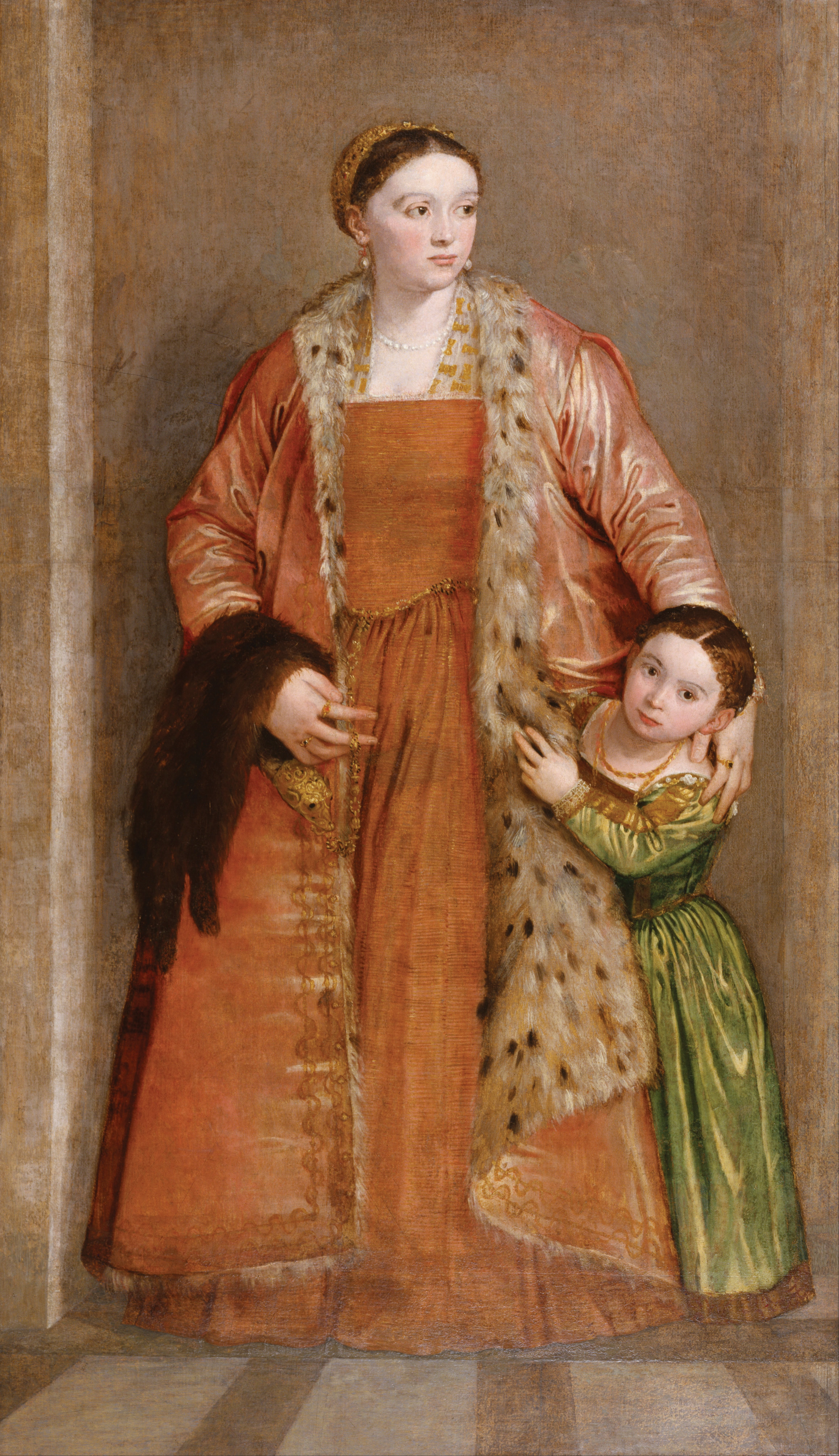
Portrait of Livia da Porto Thiene and her daughter (Baltimore)
