= Aviani =

Aviani is a surname. Notable people with the surname include:

- Francesco Aviani (died 1715), Italian painter;
- Nino Aviani, Croatian trainer.
