= Luca Bassanese =

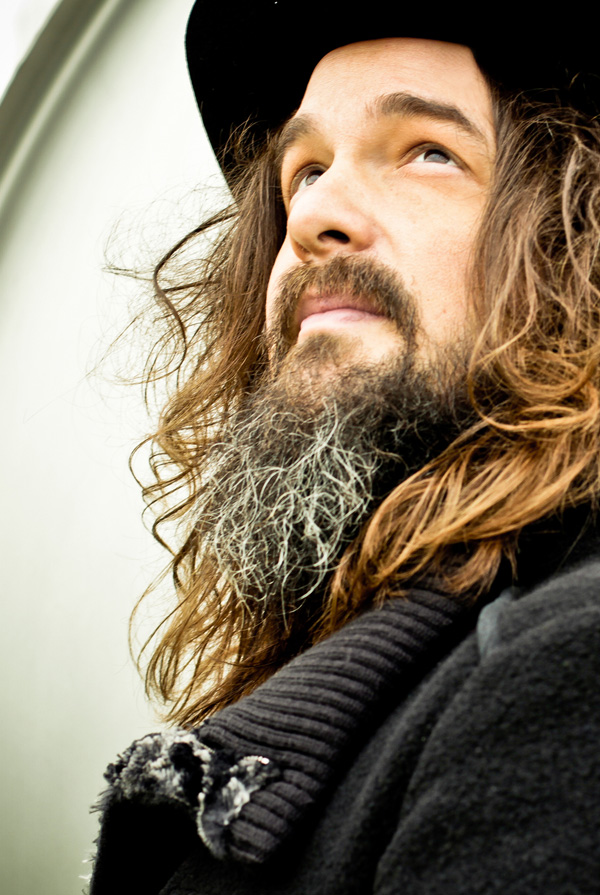
- Luca Bassanese 2015

Background information
- Born: Luca Bassanese; 18 December 1975 (age 50); Vicenza, Italy
- Genres: Folk rock, World music
- Occupations: Musician, humanitarian
- Instruments: Vocals, guitar, piano, harmonica
- Years active: 2003–present
- Labels: Venus dischi, Carosello records, Buenaonda Etichetta Discografica
- Website: Official web site

Luca Bassanese (born 18 December 1975) is an Italian singer, songwriter, actor, writer, and musician. In 2015, Bassanese won the MEI Plate 2015 (Independent Labels Meeting) as best folk music artist, the Recanati Musicultura Award and the Certificate of merit for the Civil Commitment (National Award "Marcello Torre"). Bassanese is regarded as an influential singer and songwriter in the genre of new Italian folk music. His lyrics use unconventional language, often described as satirizing poeticism, to denounce what he feels are the contradictive actions of his country.

== Career ==
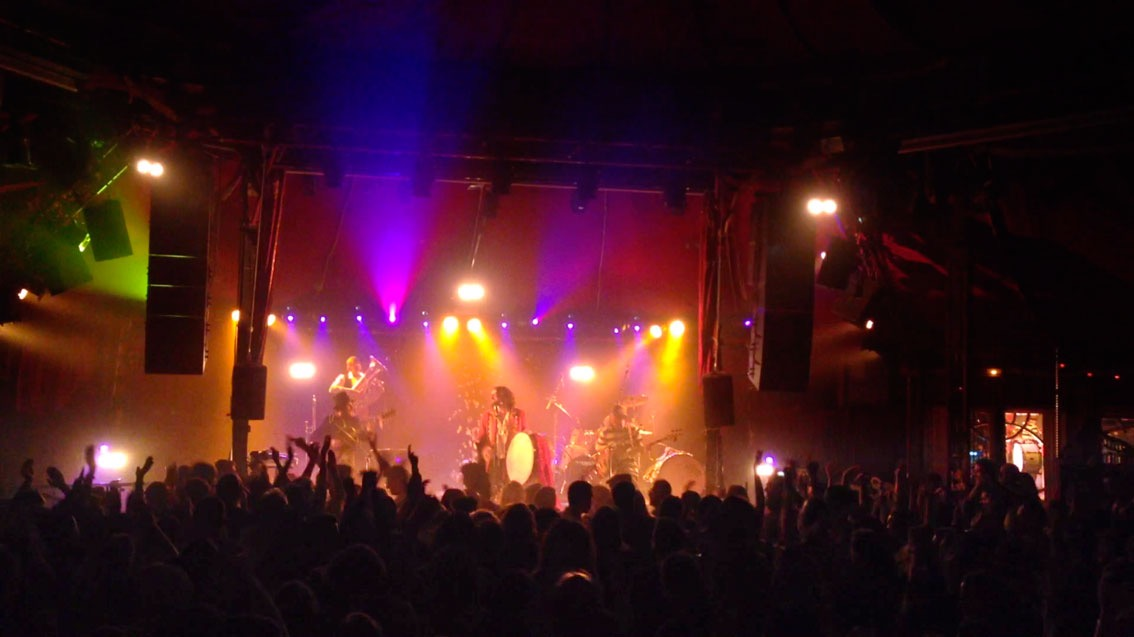
Luca Bassanese on stage – Cabaret Sauvage – Paris 2013

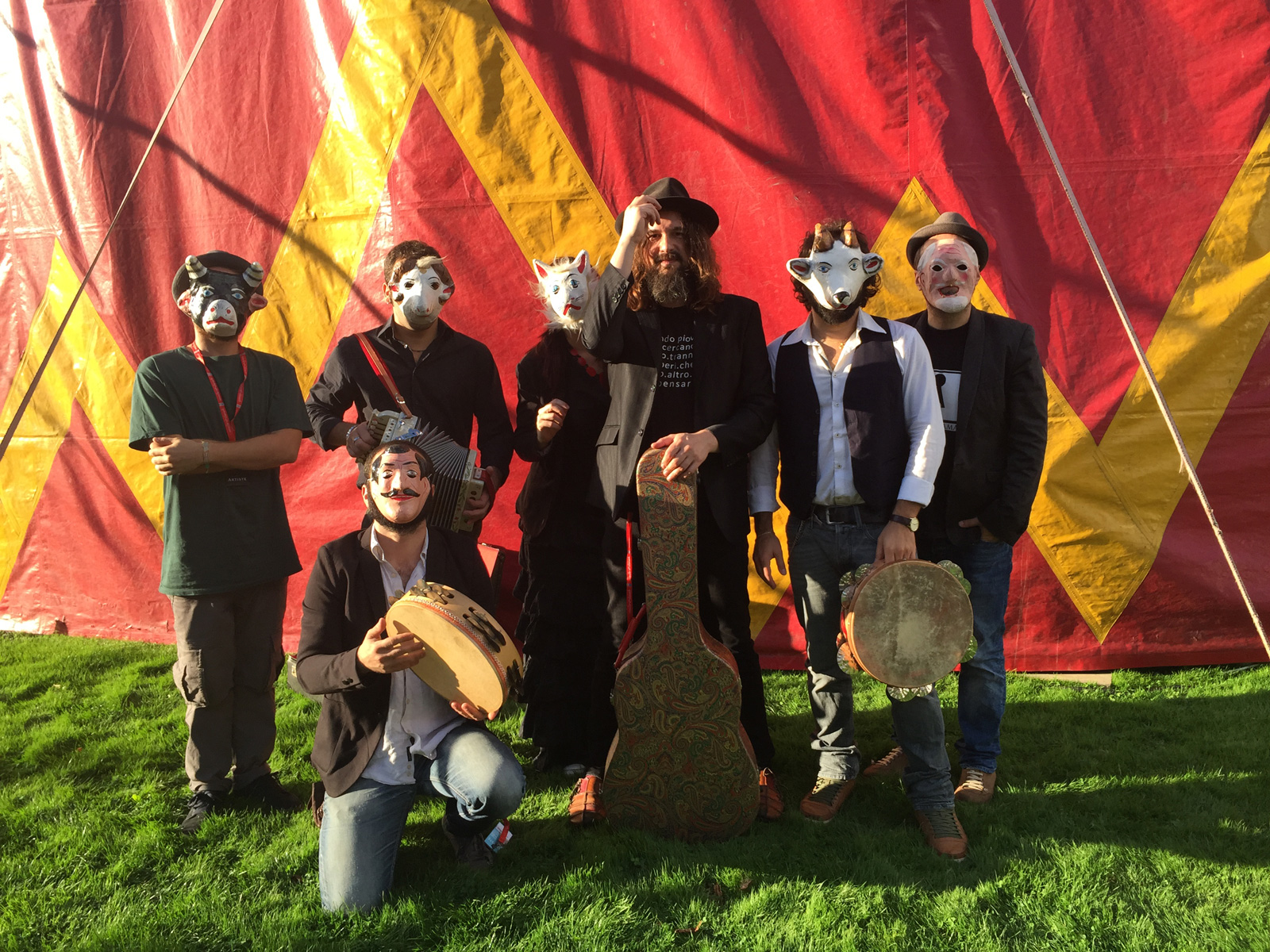
Luca Bassanese & Tarantella Circus Orchestra before the concert at Chapiteau Grand Soufflet, Parc du Thabor – Rennes 2014

There were three defining aspects of Luca Bassanese's life that are citing as setting him upon his path of making music: his listening to Fabrizio De André's Volume III album throughout his childhood and life, the influence of his father who would regularly play harmonica, and his first meeting with the composer, author and producer Stefano Florio whom had pushed him to begin as an artist and to collaborate in the development and realization of writing his albums and enacting his performances. Being an artist in response to environmental and civil commitment movements at the time, Bassanese had disclosed himself to the general public in 2004, allowing a transparent view of his work. in 2004 he also won the XV Recanati Musicultura Award edition with the piece (song) Confini. After several concerts since the beginning of his artistic career in Italy, he collaborated with national and international artists and musicians alike such as Antonio Cornacchione, Jacopo Fo and the Original Kocani Orkestar of Macedonia. Later on in his career on 23 November 2013, Bassanese would fly to France to promote his sixth album, "Popolare Contemporaneo". He achieved critical public success during this promotional tour, however he also garnered criticism with a concert held at the prestigious Cabaret Sauvage in Paris.

On 11 December 2013, Bassanese was awarded with the Certificate of merit for the Civil Commitment (National Award Marcello Torre).

In 2014 his album entitled "L'amore (è) sostenibile" the song in the album entitled "La balata dell'emigrante" is dedicated to Italian migrants and their struggles.

On 17 October 2014 Bassanese opened the Grand Soufflet Festival in Bretagne, France, followed by the establishment of a new band created for the European tour called Tarantella Circus Oschestra.

On 4 October 2015 Bassanese received the MEI (Independent Labels Meeting) Plate as "the best artist for the safeguarding of Italian folk music with particular reference to the environmental, cultural and social sustainability issues".

== Awards and nominations ==
- 2004 – Recanati/Musicultura Award, XV Edition, for the song "Confini”
- 2013 – Vrban Eco-festival Award "for the continuous research and civil commitment through his music and writing on social and environmental sustainability issues"
- 2013 – Certificate of merit for the Civil Commitment (National Award "Marcello Torre")
- 2015 – Best original soundtrack Award "Icilio Sadun" dedicated to Roberta Bartali
- 2015 – MEI (Independent Labels Meeting) Plate as the best artist for the safeguard of Italian folk music with particular reference to the environmental, cultural, and social sustainability issues

== Discography ==
=== Albums ===
| Year | Title | Label | Catalogue n° |
|---|---|---|---|
| 2005 | Oggi che il qualunquismo è un'arte mi metto da parte e vivo le cose a modo mio | X-Land | XL01 |
| 2006 | Al Mercato | X-Land/Venus | XL02 |
| 2008 | La Società dello Spettacolo | Buenaonda/Venus | BO02 |
| 2010 | Il Futuro del Mondo | Buenaonda/Carosello | BO07 |
| 2011 | C'è un mondo che si muove! | Buenaonda | BO09 |
| 2012 | La Rivoluzione | Buenaonda | BO12 |
| 2013 | Popolare contemporaneo - per l'acqua, per la terra per la dignità dei popoli | Buenaonda | BO16 |
| 2014 | L'amore (è) sostenibile | Buenaonda | BO20 |
| 2015 | Quando piove tutti cercano riparo tranne gli alberi che hanno altro a cui pensare | Buenaonda | BO21 |

== Videography ==
- A Silva – directed by Stefano Florio
- Maria – directed by Riccardo Papa
- Guernica – directed by Stefano Florio
- Santo Subito! – directed by Stefano Florio
- Canzone d'amore (contro la violenza sulle donne) – directed by Stefano Florio
- La leggenda del pesce Petrolio – directed by Stefano Florio, Marco Donazzan, Lorenzo Milan
- La Canzone del laureato – directed by Stefano Florio
- Qui si fa l'Italia o si muore – directed by Michele Piazza
- Signora speranza – directed by Michele Piazza
- Fuck Austerity! (prima che questo tempo ammazzi l'allegria) – directed by Michele Piazza
- Ho visto un re – directed by Michele Piazza
- La ballata dell'emigrante – directed by Francesco Mastronardo
- La Classe Operaia (Non va più in paradiso) – directed by Francesco Mastronardo
- Ola ola ola (tu sei Superman, tu hai venduto Peter Pan) – directed by Francesco Mastronardo

== Theatrical performances ==
- L'Italia Dimenticata – with songs of Domenico Modugno dirigé par Stefano Florio
- Un Nuovo Mondo è Possibile – with Domenico Finiguerra, dirigé par Stefano Florio
- "A Silva… la storia, la vita e l'arte di tramandarla attraverso la musica" – produced and directed by Stefano Florio

== Bibliography ==
=== Novels by Luca Bassanese ===
- Soltanto per amore, poesie, lettere e momenti di vita, ISBN 978-88-904080-0-7, Buenaonda (2009)
- Racconti di un visionario, ISBN 978-88-904080-1-4, Buenaonda (2010)
- Oggi ho imparato a volare, ISBN 978-88-904080-2-1, Buenaonda (2012)
