= Palazzo Porto, Vicenza =

UNESCO World Heritage Site
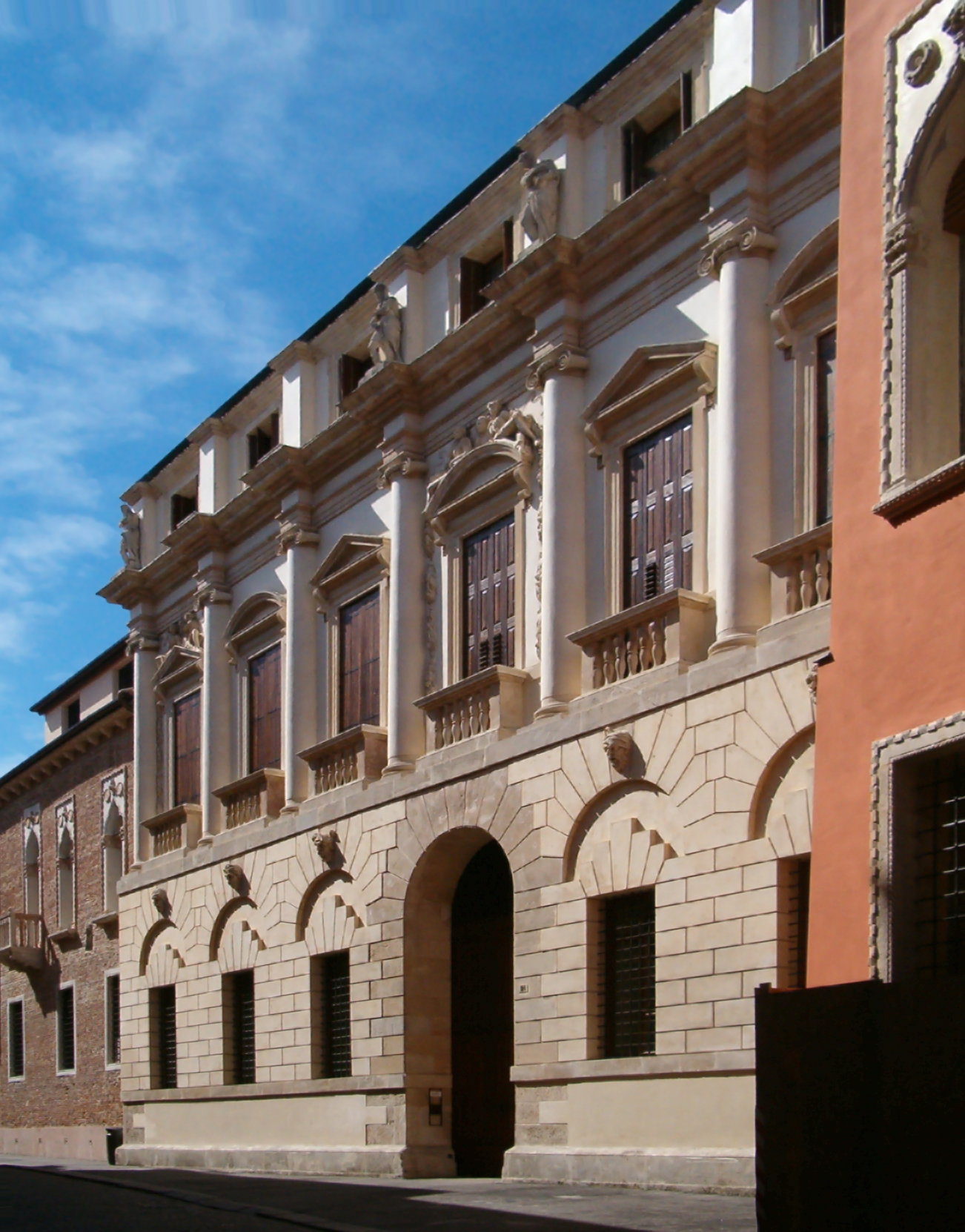

- Location within Veneto Location within Italy
- Location: Vicenza, Province of Vicenza, Veneto, Italy
- Part of: City of Vicenza and the Palladian Villas of the Veneto
- Criteria: Cultural: (i)(ii)
- Reference: 712bis-001
- Inscription: 1994 (18th Session)
- Extensions: 1996
- Coordinates: 45°32′59″N 11°32′43″E

Palazzo Porto is a palace built by Italian Renaissance architect Andrea Palladio in Contrà Porti, Vicenza, Italy. It is one of two palaces in the city designed by Palladio for members of the Porto family (the other being Palazzo Porto in Piazza Castello). Commissioned by the noble Iseppo da Porto, just married (about 1544), this building had a rather long designing stage and a longer and troublesome realization, partially unfinished.

In 1994, UNESCO included the palazzo in a World Heritage Site, the "City of Vicenza and the Palladian Villas of the Veneto".

== History ==
It is very probable that Iseppo (Giuseppe) Porto's decision to undertake construction of a great palace in the Contrà (Contrada) dei Porti was taken to emulate the edifice that his brothers-in-law Adriano and Marcantonio Thiene had begun to erect, in 1542, only a stone's throw away. It is also possible that it was Iseppo's very marriage to Livia Thiene, in the first half of the 1540s, which provided the concrete occasion for summoning Andrea Palladio.

Allied with the Thiene, the Porto were one of the city's rich and powerful families, and the palaces of the family's various branches were ranked along the Contrada which today still bears their name. Iseppo was an influential personality, with various responsibilities in the public administration of the city, responsibilities which on more than one occasion were intertwined with the assignments entrusted to Palladio. Relations between the two must very probably have been closer than between patron and architect, considering that thirty years after the project for Iseppo's city palace Palladio designed and began to build a great villa for him at Molina di Malo, subsequently never completed. The two friends died in the same year, 1580.

== Architecture ==
The palace was inhabitable from December 1549, though less than half the façade was standing and would only be completed three years later, in 1552. Numerous autograph drawings by Palladio record the complex design process. They show that right from the beginning Palladio planned for two distinct, residential blocks, one to lie along the street and the other contiguous to the back wall of the courtyard. In I quattro libri dell'architettura (1570) the two blocks are interconnected by a majestic courtyard with enormous Composite columns: this is quite clearly a re-elaboration of the original idea in the interests of publication.

Compared with the Palazzo Civena, only built a few years earlier, the Palazzo Porto fully illustrates the extent of Palladio's evolution after the journey to Rome in 1541 and his acquaintance with both antique and contemporary Roman architecture. The Bramantean model of Palazzo Caprini is here reinterpreted, with Palladio observing the Vicentine custom of living on the ground floor, which is higher as a result. The splendid, four-columned atrium represents Palladio's reinterpretation of Vitruvian spaces, but one where traditional Vicentine typologies also survive.

The two rooms to the left of the atrium were frescoed by Paolo Veronese and Domenico Brusasorzi, while the stuccoes are by Bartolomeo Ridolfi. On the palace attic, the statues of Iseppo and his son Leonida, in antique Roman garb, keep watch over the entrance of visitors to their house.

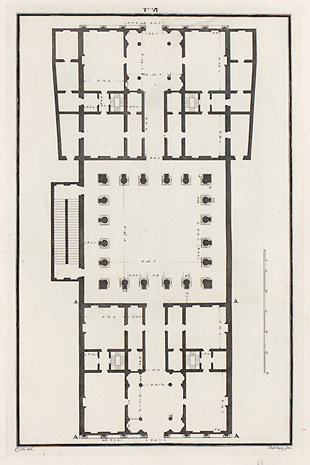
Floor plan (drawing by Ottavio Bertotti Scamozzi, 1776)

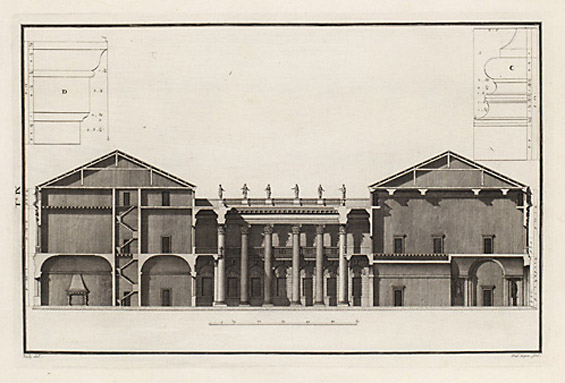
Cross section (Ottavio Bertotti Scamozzi, 1776)

=== Interiors ===
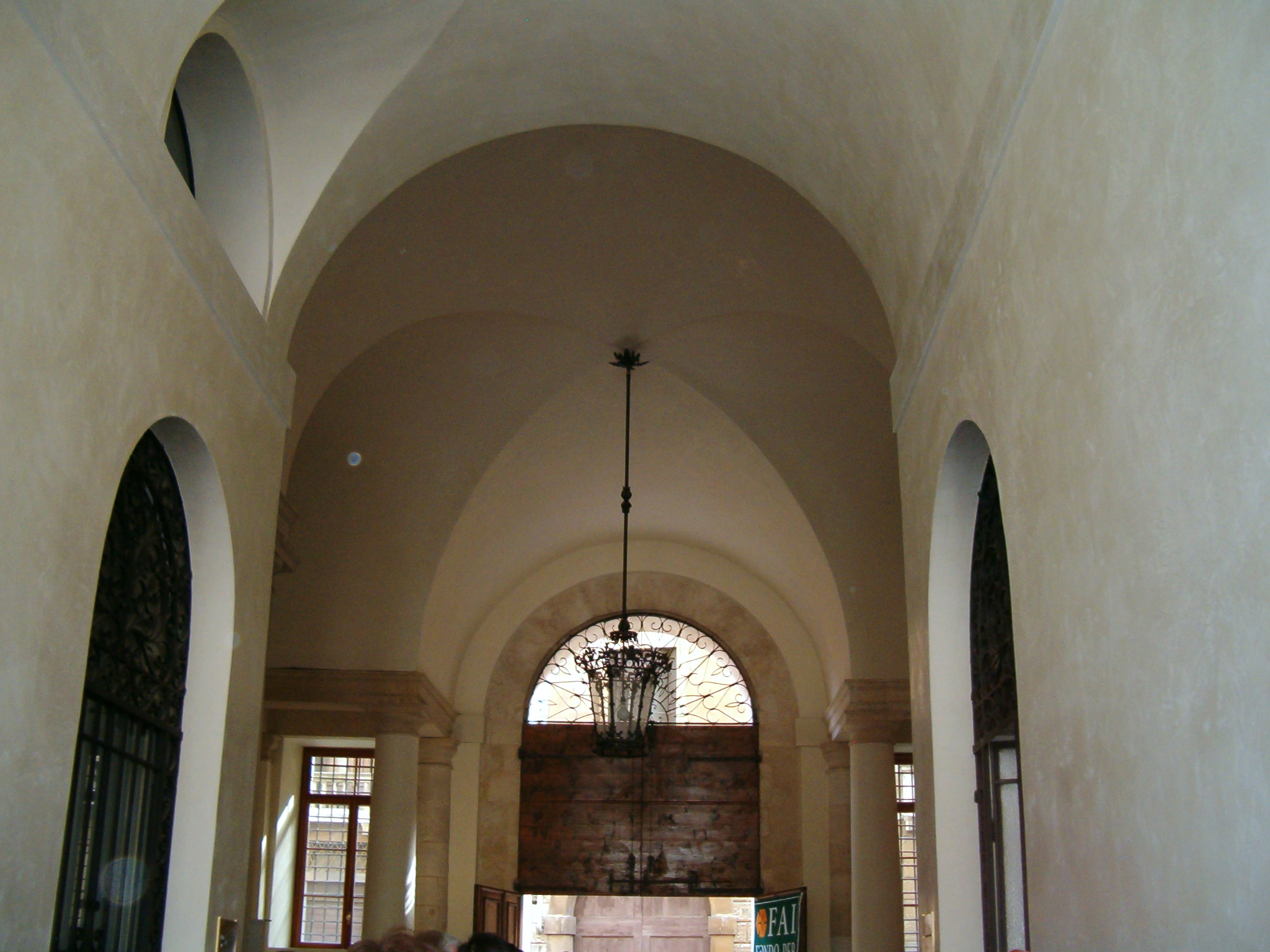
The large atrium

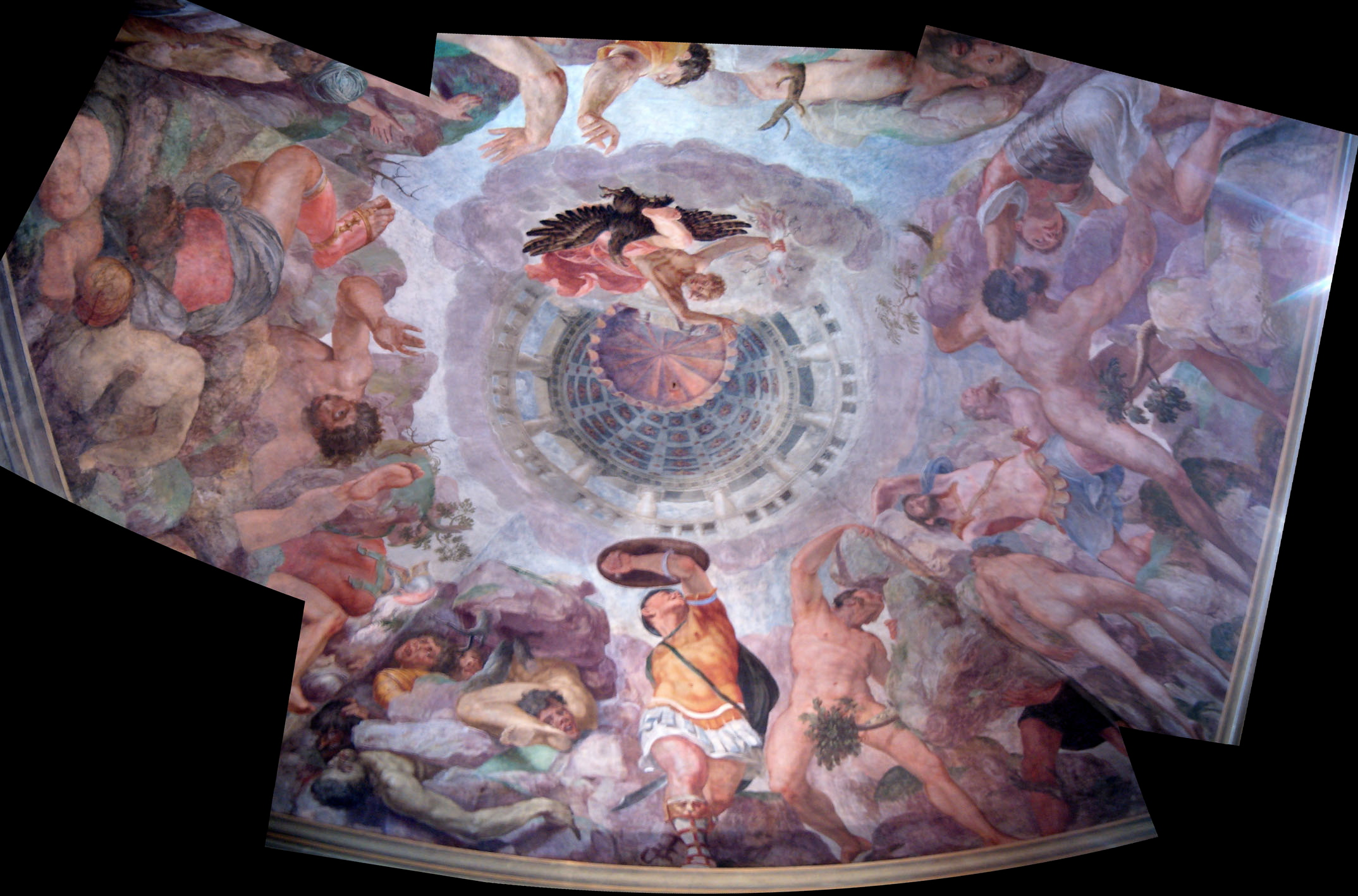
Part of the frescoed ceiling in the great hall with the Fall of the Giants by Domenico Brusasorzi

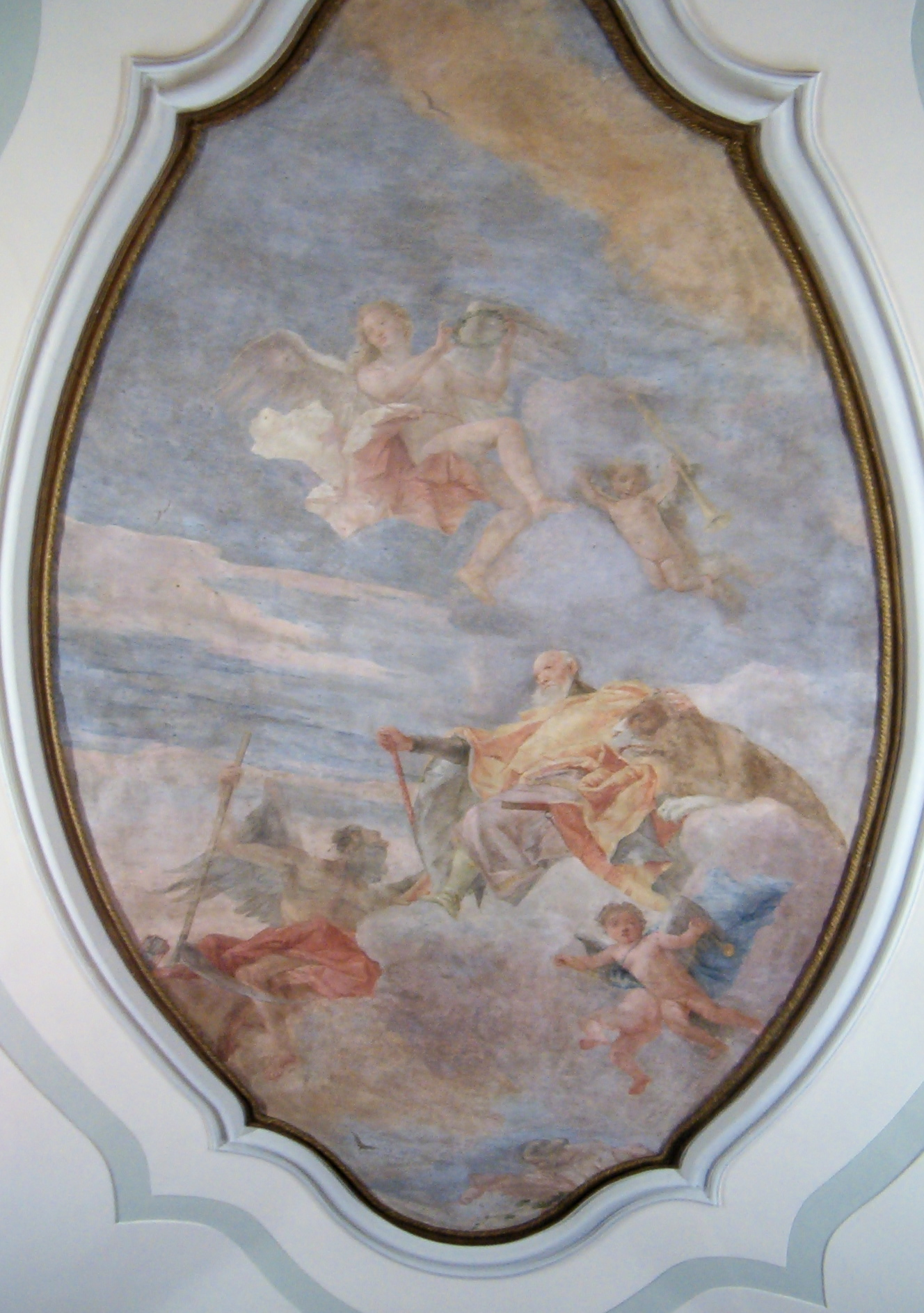
Sinopia on a medallion on the ceiling

== See also ==
- Villa Porto (Molina di Malo)
- Portrait of Iseppo da Porto and his son Adriano

== Sources ==
- E. Forssman, Palazzo di Porto Festa a Vicenza, CISA Palladio, Vicenza 1973
