= Palazzo Porto in Piazza Castello =

Coordinates: 45°32′44.44″N 11°32′28.94″E

UNESCO World Heritage Site
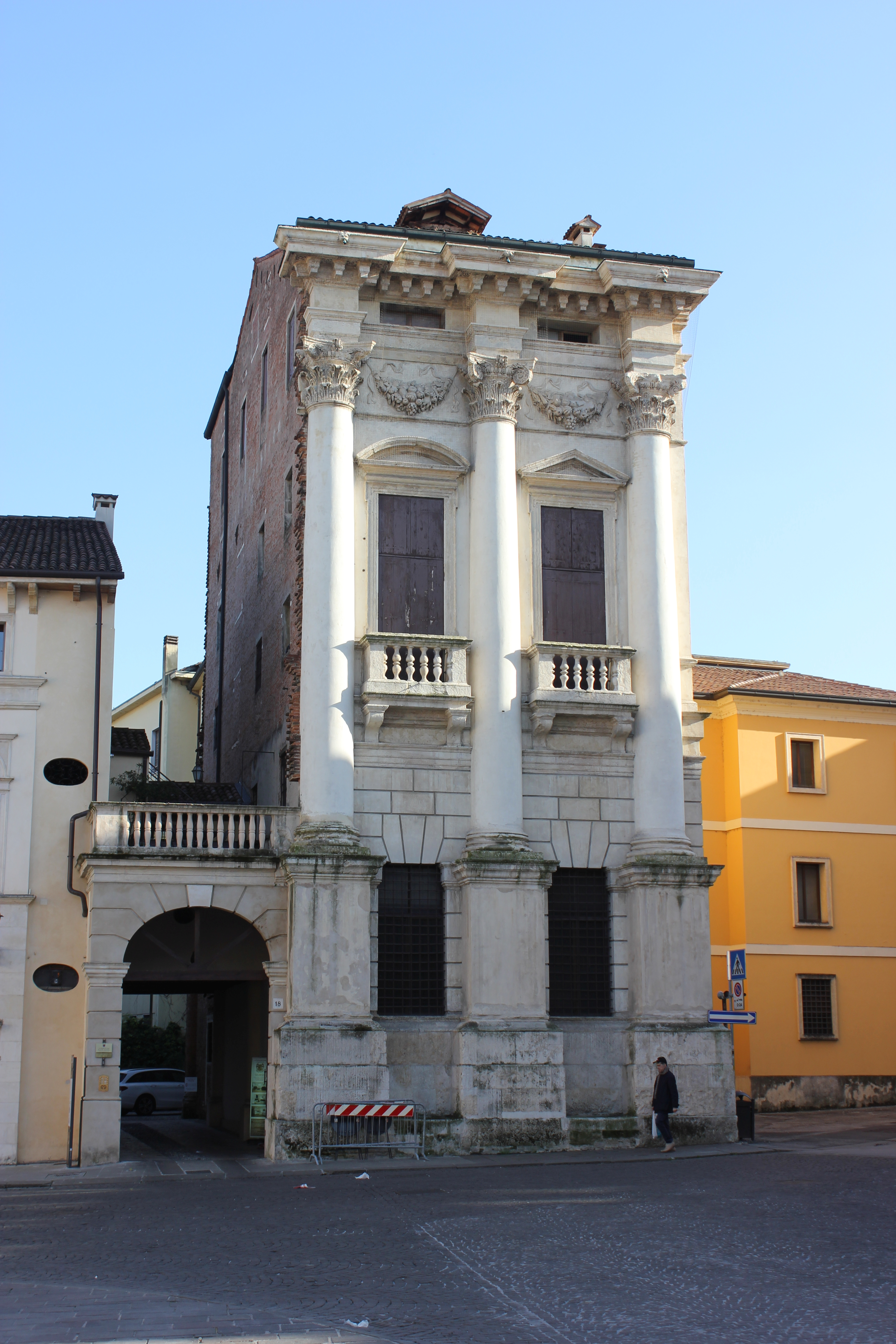

- Location within Veneto Location within Italy
- Location: Vicenza, Province of Vicenza, Veneto, Italy
- Part of: "City of Vicenza" part of City of Vicenza and the Palladian Villas of the Veneto
- Criteria: Cultural: (i)(ii)
- Reference: 712bis-001
- Inscription: 1994 (18th Session)
- Extensions: 1996

The Palazzo Porto is a palace in Piazza Castello, Vicenza, northern Italy. It is one of two palazzi in the city designed by Andrea Palladio for members of the Porto family (the other is Palazzo Porto, for Iseppo Porto, in contrà Porti). Only two bays of it were ever built, beginning shortly after 1571. Why the patron, Alessandro Porto, did not continue with the project is not known.

== History ==
For completing the scheme, which was probably intended to have been seven bays wide, the Porto family's 15th-century case, still standing to the left of the great architectural torso, would have been incrementally demolished. The structure was completed after Palladio's death by Vincenzo Scamozzi. The project seems to have been initiated immediately following the publication in 1570 of Palladio's I quattro libri dell'architettura, in which its design does not appear.

It was illustrated by Ottavio Bertotti Scamozzi in 1776, who called it the Casa Porto and traced the extent of foundations built for it, suggesting that an interior courtyard with an exedra end was contemplated, of which part was built. Bertotti Scamozzi attributed its design to Vincenzo Scamozzi.

== Architecture ==
Palazzo Porto in Piazza Casello shows the influence of Palladio's Roman visit. Its grandiose scale was not purely competitive with the Thiene, with whom the Porto were connected by contemporary marriages and whose palazzo faces it across the broad piazza, but corresponds with its urban position, intended to shape and dominate a great open space.

The two standing bays show the intended design: a giant order of engaged Composite columns stand on high socles – themselves on bases that are taller than a person – against the crisp and flat rustication of the basement. The full expression of the order in columns breaks the entablature boldly forward over each column; it is one-fifth the height of the columns and pierced with windows in the manner of Baldassare Peruzzi, to give light to rooms of a mezzanine. A frieze carved with swags of oak garlands in bold relief, hung from the abaci of the capitals, passes between them, creating a richly sculptural unbroken band across the façade. Windows with alternating triangular and segmental pediments are each provided with a balustraded balcony supported by brackets.

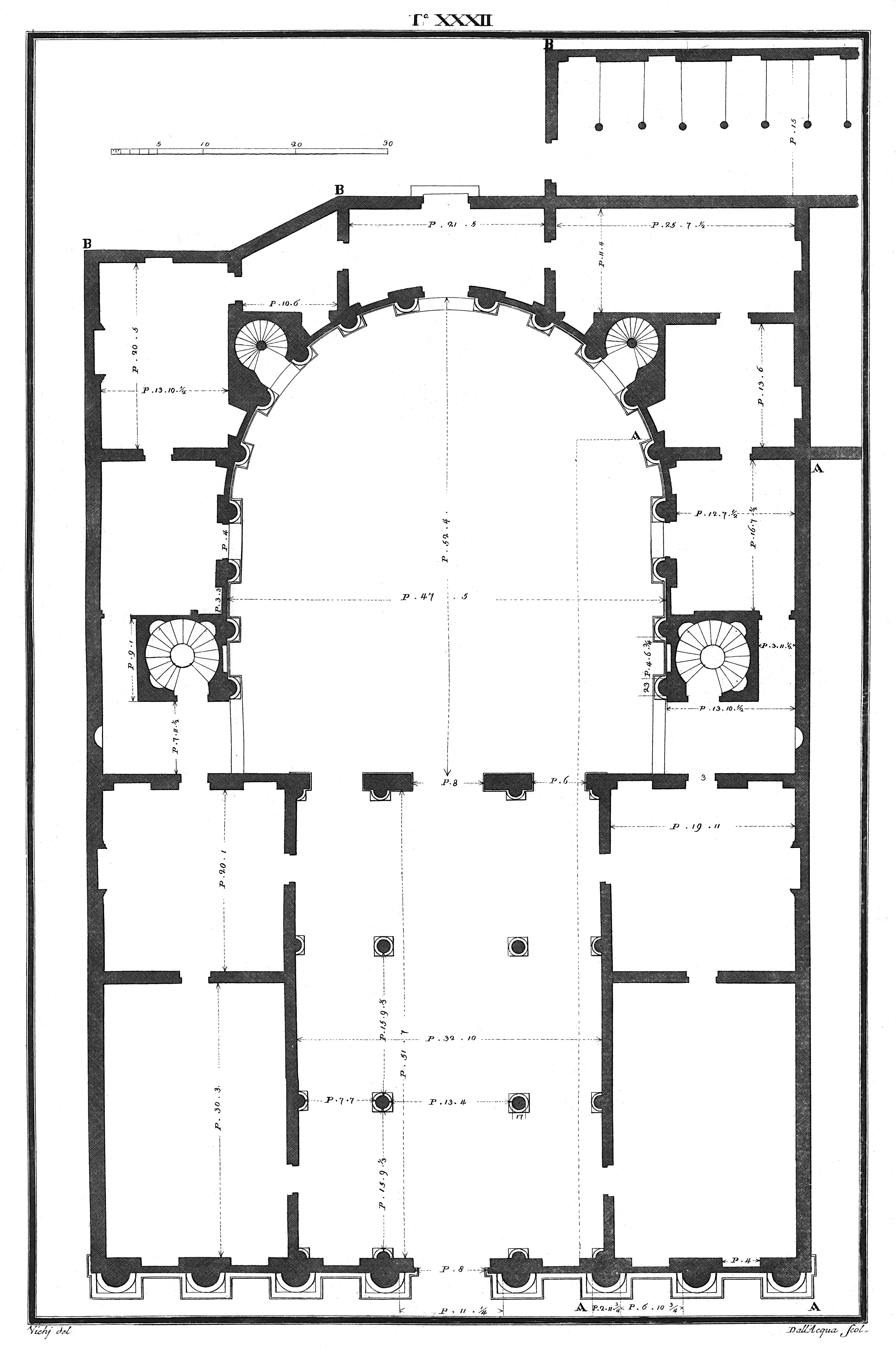
Floor plan (drawing by Ottavio Bertotti Scamozzi, 1776

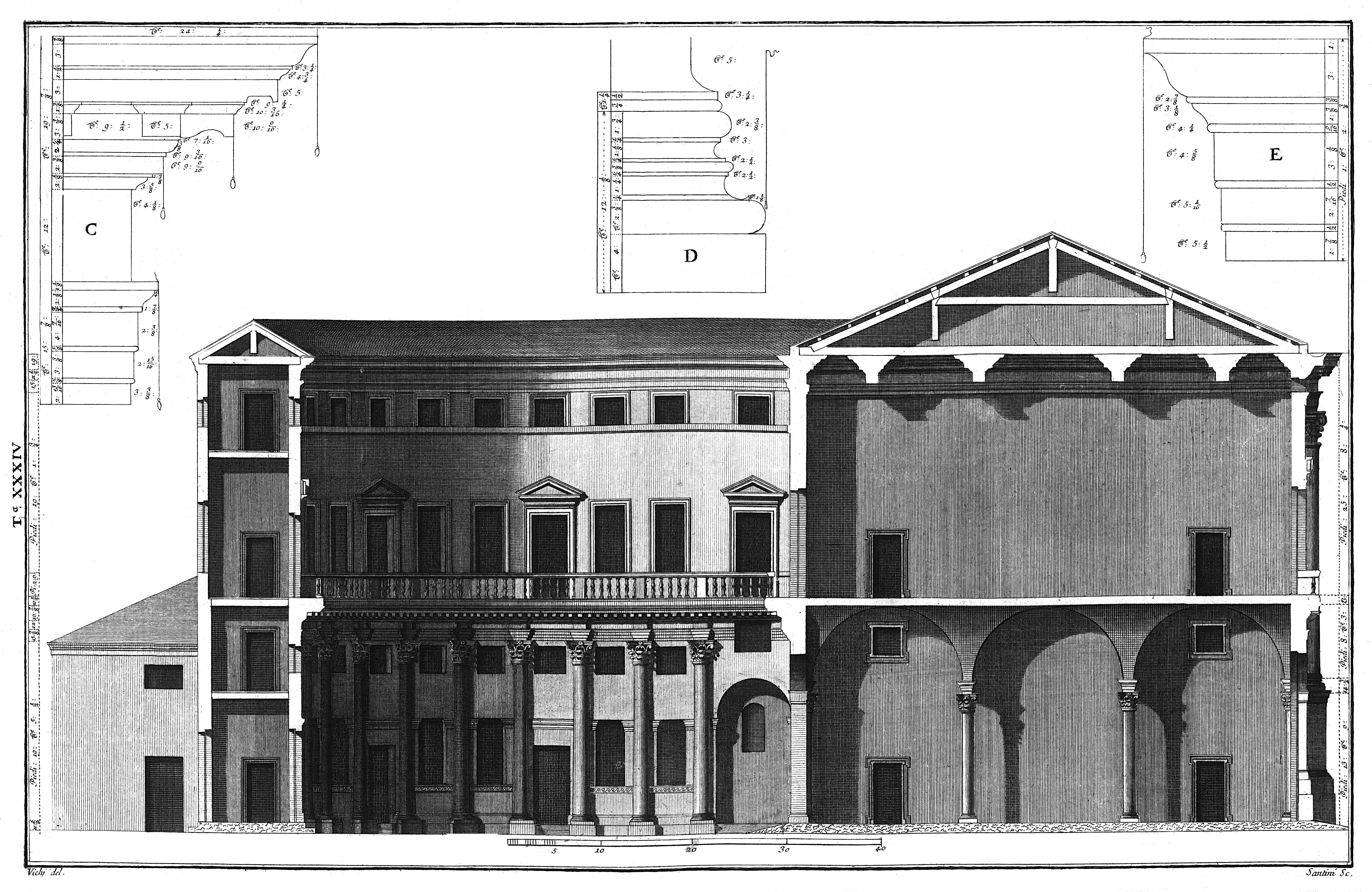
Cross section (Ottavio Bertotti Scamozzi, 1776)

== Conservation ==
In 1994, UNESCO designated "Vicenza, City of Palladio" a World Heritage Site to protect the Palladian architecture of Vicenza. In 1996, the site was expanded to include the villas elsewhere in the Veneto and it was renamed "City of Vicenza and the Palladian Villas of the Veneto".

== See also ==
- Villa Porto, Molina di Malo
