= Santa Maria Etiopissa, Vicenza =

Catholic church in Vicenza province, Italy

Coordinates: 45°36′21.2″N 11°33′25.7″E

Santa Maria Etiopissa is a Romanesque-style, Roman Catholic church located on Strada Marosticana in the neighborhood of Polegge of Vicenza, region of Veneto, Italy. The church was once part of a Lombard abbey.

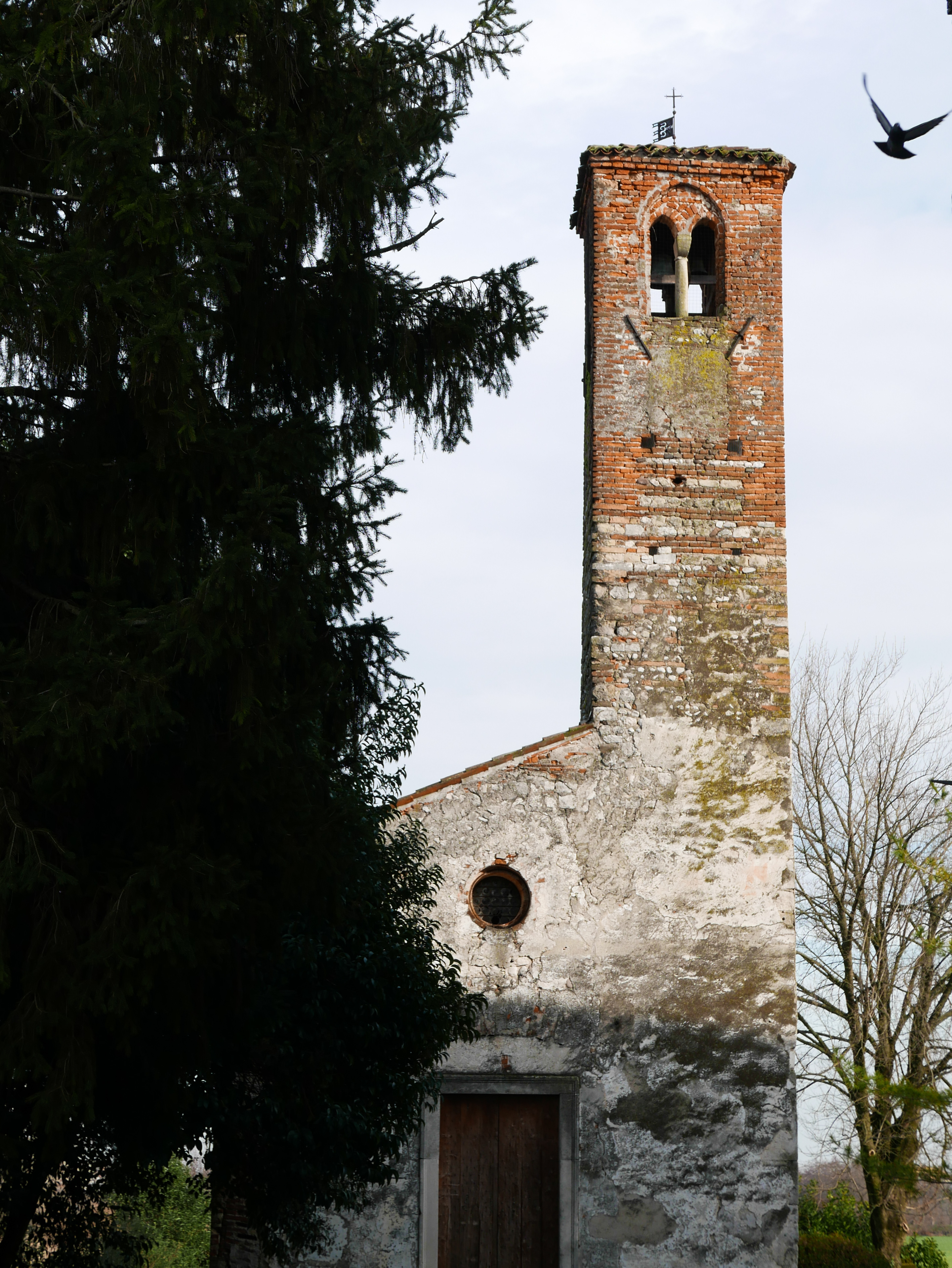
Facade and belltower

== History ==
A church at the site is documented since 1154 as belonging to the Abbey of Pomposa. The church underwent reconstruction around 1490. The simple stone and brick structure has a single, rectangular nave, with a square apse. The bell-tower arises awkwardly from a corner of the facade. A stone bas-relief in the church dates possibly to the 6th or 7th century. A more recent reconstruction took place in 1933.
