= Bruno Zamborlin =

Italian researcher, entrepreneur and artist

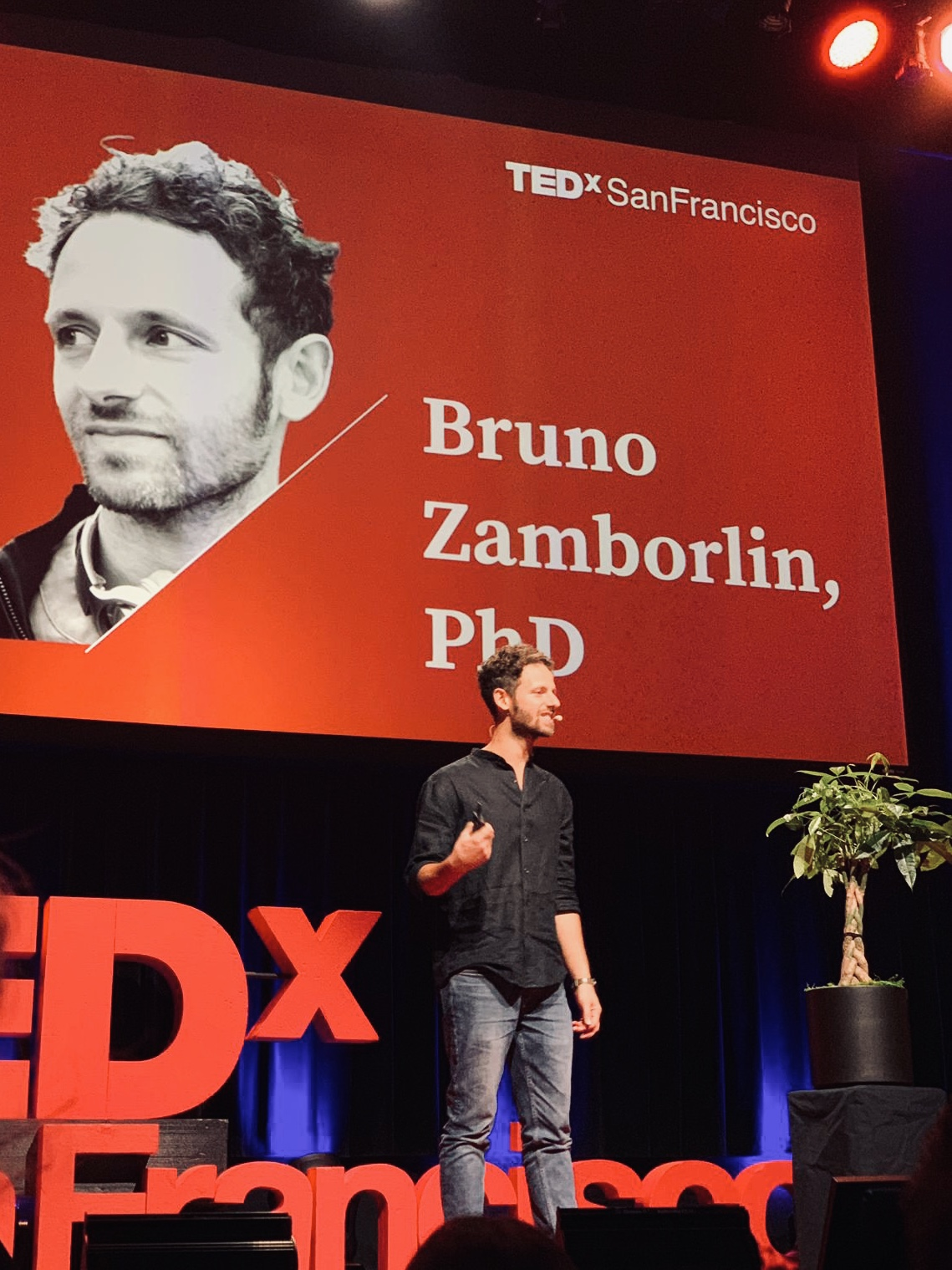
- Born: July 1983 (age 43); Vicenza, Italy
- Education: Goldsmiths, University of London; IRCAM - Centre Pompidou
- Occupations: Entrepreneur, artist

Bruno Zamborlin (born 1983 in Vicenza) is an AI researcher, entrepreneur and artist based between London and Milan, working in the field of human-computer interaction. His work focuses on converting physical objects into touch-sensitive, interactive surfaces using vibration sensors and artificial intelligence. In 2013, he founded Mogees Limited a start-up to transform everyday objects into musical instruments and games using a vibration sensor and a mobile phone. With HyperSurfaces, he converts physical surfaces of any material, shape and form into data-enabled-interactive surfaces using a vibration sensor and a coin-sized chipset. As an artist, he has created art installations around the world, with his most recent work comprising a unique series of "sound furnitures" that was showcased at the Italian Pavilion of the Venice Biennale 2023. He regularly performed with UK-based electronic music duo Plaid (Warp Records). He is also honorary visiting research fellow at Goldsmiths, University of London.

== Early life and education ==
From 2008-2011, Zamborlin worked at the IRCAM (Institute for Research and Coordination Acoustic Musical) – Centre Pompidou as a member of the Sound Music Movement Interaction team. Under the supervision of Frederic Bevilacqua, he started experimenting with the use of artificial intelligence and human movements, and contributed to the creation of Gesture Follower, a software used to analyse body movements of performers and dancers through motion sensors in order to control sound and visual media in real-time, slowing down or speeding up their reproduction based on the speed the gestures are performed.

He has lived in London since 2011, where he developed a joint PhD between Goldsmiths, University of London and IRCAM - Centre Pompidou/Pierre and Marie Curie University Paris in AI, focussing on the concept of Interactive Machine Learning applied to digital musical instruments and performing arts.

== Career ==
Zamborlin founded Mogees Limited in 2013 in London, with IRCAM being amongst the early partners. Mogees transform physical objects into musical instruments and games using a vibration sensor and a series of apps for smartphones and desktop. After a campaign on Kickstarter in 2014, Mogees was used both by common users and artists such as Rodrigo y Gabriela, Jean-Michel Jarre and Plaid. The algorithms implemented in these apps employ a special version of physical modelling sound synthesis, where the vibration produced by users when interacting with the physical object are used as exciter for a digital resonator which runs in the app. The result is a hybrid, half acoustic and half digital sound which is a function of both software and acoustic properties of the physical object the users decide to play.

In 2017, Zamborlin founded HyperSurfaces together with computational artist Parag K Mital. to merge "the physical and the digital worlds". HyperSurfaces technology converts any surface made of any material, shape and size into data-enabled interactive objects, employing a vibration sensor and proprietary AI algorithms running on a coin-sized chipset. The vibrations generated by people's interactions on the surface are converted into an electric signal by a piezoelectric sensor and analysed in realtime by AI algorithms that run on the chipset. Anytime the AI recognises in the vibration signal one of the events that have been predefined by the user beforehand, a corresponding notification message is generated in realtime and sent to some application. The technology can be applied to anything ranging from button-less human-computer interaction applications for automotive and smart home to the Internet of things. Because the AI algorithms employed by HyperSurfaces run locally on a chipset, without the need to access cloud-based services, they are considered to be part of the field of edge computing. Also, because the AI can be trained beforehand to recognise the events its users are interested in, HyperSurfaces algorithms belong to the field of supervised machine learning.

== Selected awards ==
- IRISA Prix Jeune Chercheur, 13 October 2012
- NeMoDe, New Economic Models in the Digital Economy, 25 October 2012

== Patents and academic publications ==
- United States pending US10817798B2, Bruno Zamborlin & Carmine Emanuele Cella, "Method to recognize a gesture and corresponding device", published 27 April 2016, assigned to Mogees Limited
- GB Pending WO/2019/086862, Bruno Zamborlin; Conor Barry & Alessandro Saccoia et al., "A user interface for vehicles", published 9 May 2019, assigned to Mogees Limited
- GB Pending WO/2019/086863, Bruno Zamborlin; Conor Barry & Alessandro Saccoia et al., "Trigger for game events", published 9 May 2019, assigned to Mogees Limited
- Bevilacqua, Frédéric; Zamborlin, Bruno; Sypniewski, Anthony; Schnell, Norbert; Guédy, Fabrice; Rasamimanana, Nicolas (2010). "Continuous Realtime Gesture Following and Recognition". Gesture in Embodied Communication and Human-Computer Interaction. Lecture Notes in Computer Science. Vol. 5934. pp. 73–84. doi:10.1007/978-3-642-12553-9_7. ISBN 978-3-642-12552-2. S2CID 16251822.
- Rasamimanana, Nicolas; Bevilacqua, Frédéric; Schnell, Norbert; Guédy, Fabrice; Flety, Emmanuel; Maestracci, Come; Zamborlin, Bruno (January 2010). "Modular musical objects towards embodied control of digital music". Proceedings of the fifth international conference on Tangible, embedded, and embodied interaction. Tei '11. pp. 9–12. doi:10.1145/1935701.1935704. ISBN 9781450304788. S2CID 10782645.
- Bevilacqua, Frédéric; Schnell, Norbert; Rasamimanana, Nicolas; Zamborlin, Bruno; Guedy, Fabrice (2011). "Online Gesture Analysis and Control of Audio Processing". Musical Robots and Interactive Multimodal Systems. Springer Tracts in Advanced Robotics. Vol. 74. pp. 127–142. doi:10.1007/978-3-642-22291-7_8. ISBN 978-3-642-22290-0.
- Zamborlin, Bruno; Bevilacqua, Frédéric; Gillies, Marco; D'Inverno, Mark (15 January 2014). "Fluid gesture interaction design: Applications of continuous recognition for the design of modern gestural interfaces". ACM Transactions on Interactive Intelligent Systems. 3 (4): 22:1–22:30. doi:10.1145/2543921. S2CID 7887245.
- Leslie, Grace; Zamborlin, Bruno; Schnell, Norbert; Jodlowski, Pierre (15 June 2010). "A Collaborative, Interactive Sound Installation". Proceedings of the International Computer Music Conference.
- Kimura, Mari; Rasamimanana, Nicolas; Bevilacqua, Frédéric; Zamborlin, Bruno; Schnell, Bruno; Flety, Emmanuel (2012). "Extracting Human Expression For Interactive Composition with the Augmented Violin". International Conference on New Interfaces for Musical Expression.
- Ferretti, Stefano; Roccetti, Marco; Zamborlin, Bruno (13 January 2009). "On SPAWC: Discussion on a Musical Signal Parser and Well-Formed Composer". 2009 6th IEEE Consumer Communications and Networking Conference. pp. 1–5. doi:10.1109/CCNC.2009.4784966. ISBN 978-1-4244-2308-8. S2CID 14213587.
- Zamborlin, Bruno; Partesana, Giorgio; Liuni, Marco (15 May 2011). "(LAND)MOVES". Conference on New Interfaces for Musical Expression, NIME: 537–538.
