= Villa Porto, Molina di Malo =

Unfinished patrician villa in Molina di Malo, northern Italy

Coordinates: 45.6727°N 11.4639°E

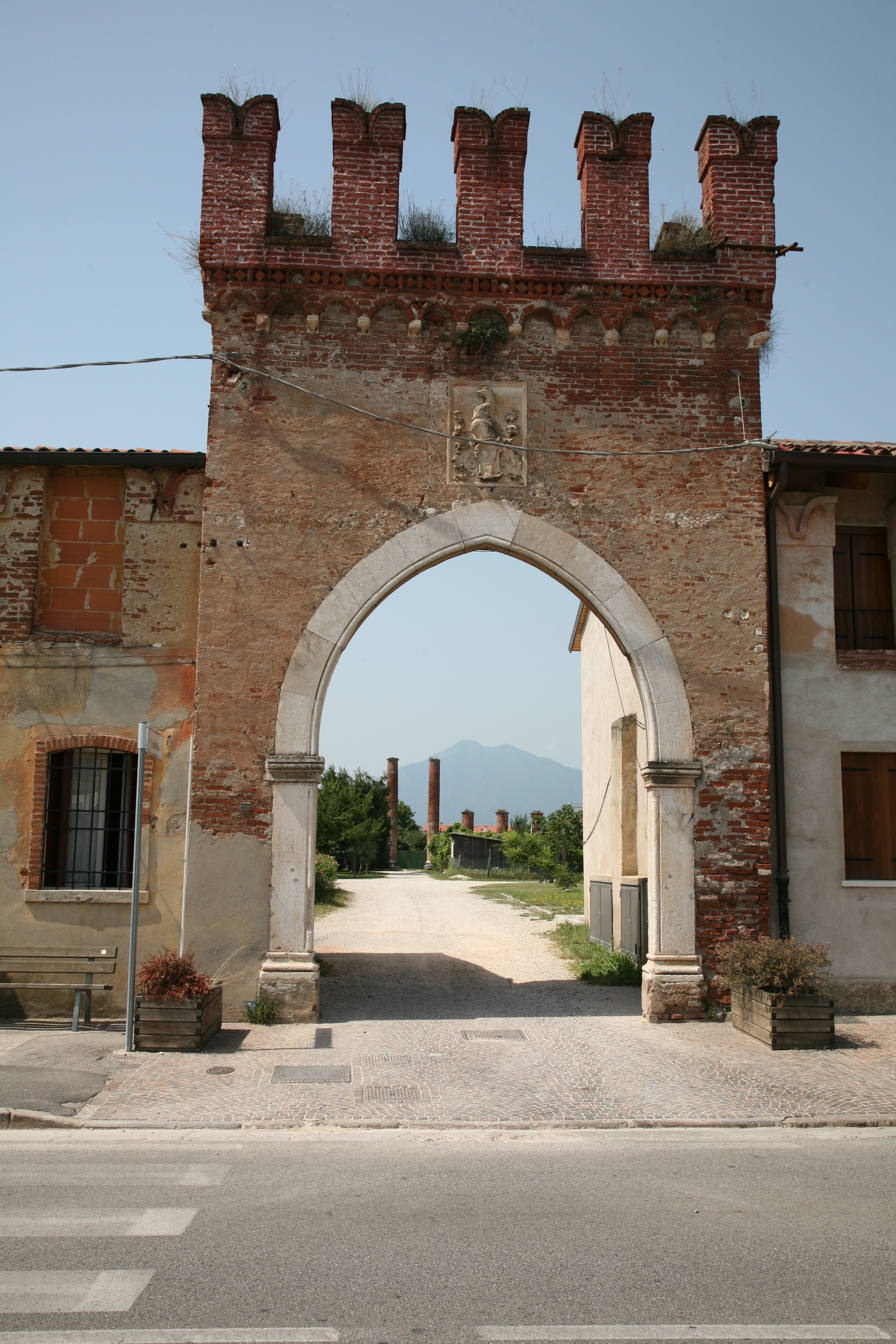
Entrance to the Villa Porto

Villa Porto is an unfinished patrician villa in Molina di Malo, Province of Vicenza, northern Italy, designed by Italian Renaissance architect Andrea Palladio in 1570.

== History ==
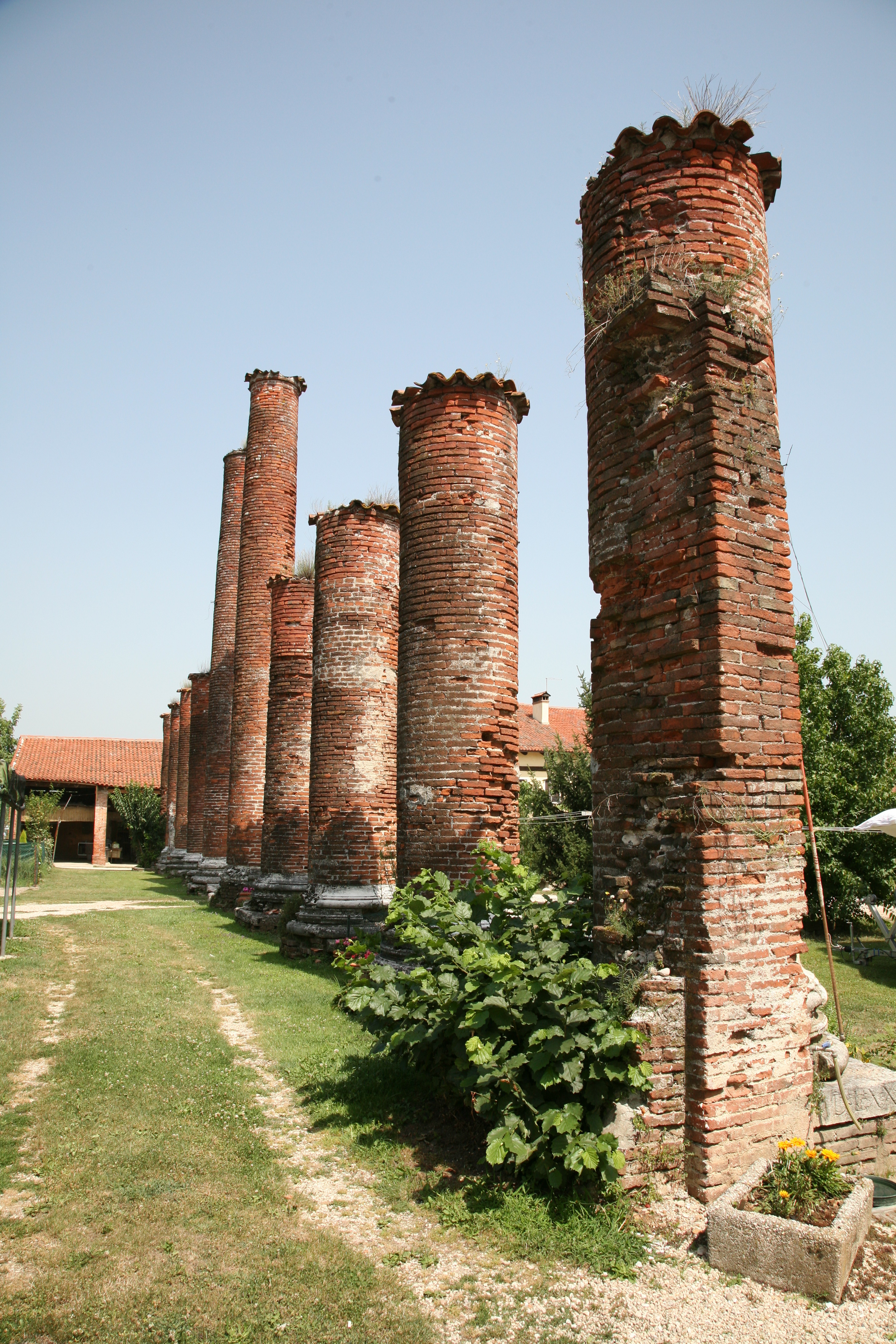
The remaining columns of Villa Porto

The ten brick-column shafts that dominate the great 15th century farmyard of the Porto family at Molina mark the first stage of a grandiose project conceived by Palladio on behalf of Iseppo (Giuseppe) Porto: in fact, the patron’s name is inscribed on the plinths of the splendid stone column bases, next to the date 1572.

The rich protagonist of one of Vicenza’s most important families, and brother-in-law of both Adriano and Marcantonio Thiene (patrons of the homonymous palace by Palladio), Iseppo Porto already owned a grandiose city palace, which Palladio had designed him over twenty years earlier, Palazzo Porto.

Archival documents show that the enormous columns are not the fragments of a monumental barchessa, like that for the Villa Pisani at Bagnolo, but rather of the façade of a true and proper country residence. The large Corinthian colonnade, a direct quotation from the pronaos of the Pantheon, would have reached an overall height of over thirteen metres. Lower porticoes, on a quarter-circle plan and still visible in the 19th century, would have tied the manorial house to agricultural annexes to left and right.

This edifice recalls two other projects by Palladio, the Villa Mocenigo on the Brenta and the Villa Thiene at Cicogna, neither of which was ever executed though both are documented by various autograph sketches and were included in the I quattro libri dell'architettura. In publishing Giuseppe Porto’s city palace in the Quattro libri, Palladio enriched the original project with a courtyard of a giant Composite order extremely close to that of the villa at Molina. Giuseppe’s death in 1580 put an end to the building works, which were never completed.

== See also ==
- Palladian Villas of the Veneto
- Palladian architecture
- Palazzo Porto in Piazza Castello
- Palazzo Porto, Vicenza
