= Antonio Magrini =

Antonio Magrini (3 October 1805 - 7 January 1872) was an Italian priest and architectural historian, specially of the works of Andrea Palladio.

He was born to parents of little resources, and studied in Vicenza. Among his works of art were:

- Memorie storiche sulla vita di Andrea Palladio (1845, Padua)
- It Teatro Olimpico nuovamente descritto e illustrato (1847, Padua)
- Il palazzo del Museo Civico descritto e illustrato (1855, Vicenza) regarding Palazzo Chiericati
- Intorno al vero archittetto del Ponte di Rialto in Venezia (1854, Vicenza)
- Dell"architettura in Vicenza, con appendice delle principali sue fabbriche negli ultimi otto secoli (1845, Padua)
- Scritture inedite in materia di architettura
- Descrizione della chiesa cattedralle in Vicenza (1854, Vicenza)
- Il Palazzo Angaran in Vicenza (unbuilt palace)
- Cenni Storico-critici sulla vita e sulle opere di Giovanni Antonio Fasolo (1851, Venice)
- Elogio di Bartolommeo Montagna (1862, Atti dell'accademia di belle Arti of Venice)
- Sopra 50 medaglia di V. Belli (1871, Venice)

He also published a number of sermons.
