= Francesco Aviani =

Italian painter (1662-1715)

Francesco Aviani (1662?–1715), was a native of Vicenza, Republic of Venice who flourished about the year 1630. He excelled in painting perspective and architectural views, which were frequently embellished with figures by Giulio Carpioni. His pictures usually represent the most remarkable views in Venice. He also produced some landscapes and seaports.

He was born in Venice, most likely on 25 November 1662, by Bernardo and by a Magdalene whose surname is unknown, and was most probably baptized in the cathedral on 3 December 1662. Between 1701 and 1703 he decorated with frescoes (today illegible) the villa Chiericati in Soella (his brother Marco the sculptor was also with him). On 16 October 1703 he married Isabella Carcano. On 26 March 1715 he made a will. On 3 April 1715 he died in Vicenza and it is from his age at the moment of death, about fifty-two years that his date of birth was traced to 1662.
