= Vicenza =

Comune in Veneto, Italy

Vicenza Vicença (Venetian)
- Comune
- Città di Vicenza
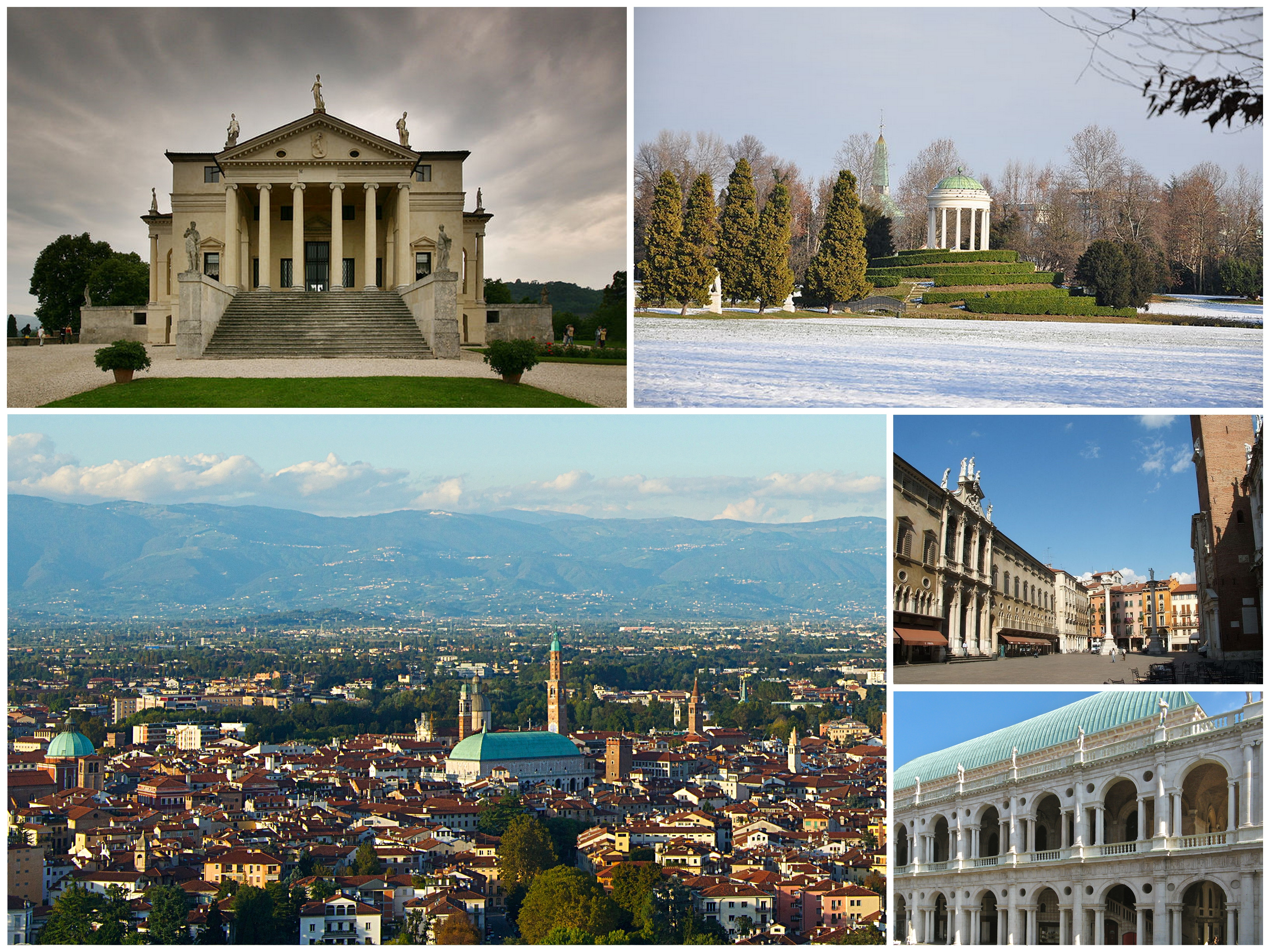
- Clockwise from top: Villa La Rotonda; the classical temple in the Parco Querini; Piazza dei Signori; the Renaissance Basilica Palladiana; and a panorama of the city from the Monte Berico

- Flag Coat of arms

- Location within Italy Location within Veneto
- Coordinates: 45°33′N 11°33′E
- Country: Italy
- Region: Veneto
- Province: Vicenza (VI)

Government
  - Mayor: Giacomo Possamai (Centre-left)

Area
  - Total: 80.57 km^{2} (31.11 sq mi)
- Elevation: 39 m (128 ft)

Population (2026)
  - Total: 110,741
  - Density: 1,374/km^{2} (3,560/sq mi)
- Demonym: Vicentini
- Time zone: UTC+1 (CET)
  - Summer (DST): UTC+2 (CEST)
- Postal code: 36100
- Dialing code: 0444
- Patron saint: Madonna of Monte Berico
- Saint day: September 8
- Website: Official website

Vicenza
UNESCO World Heritage Site
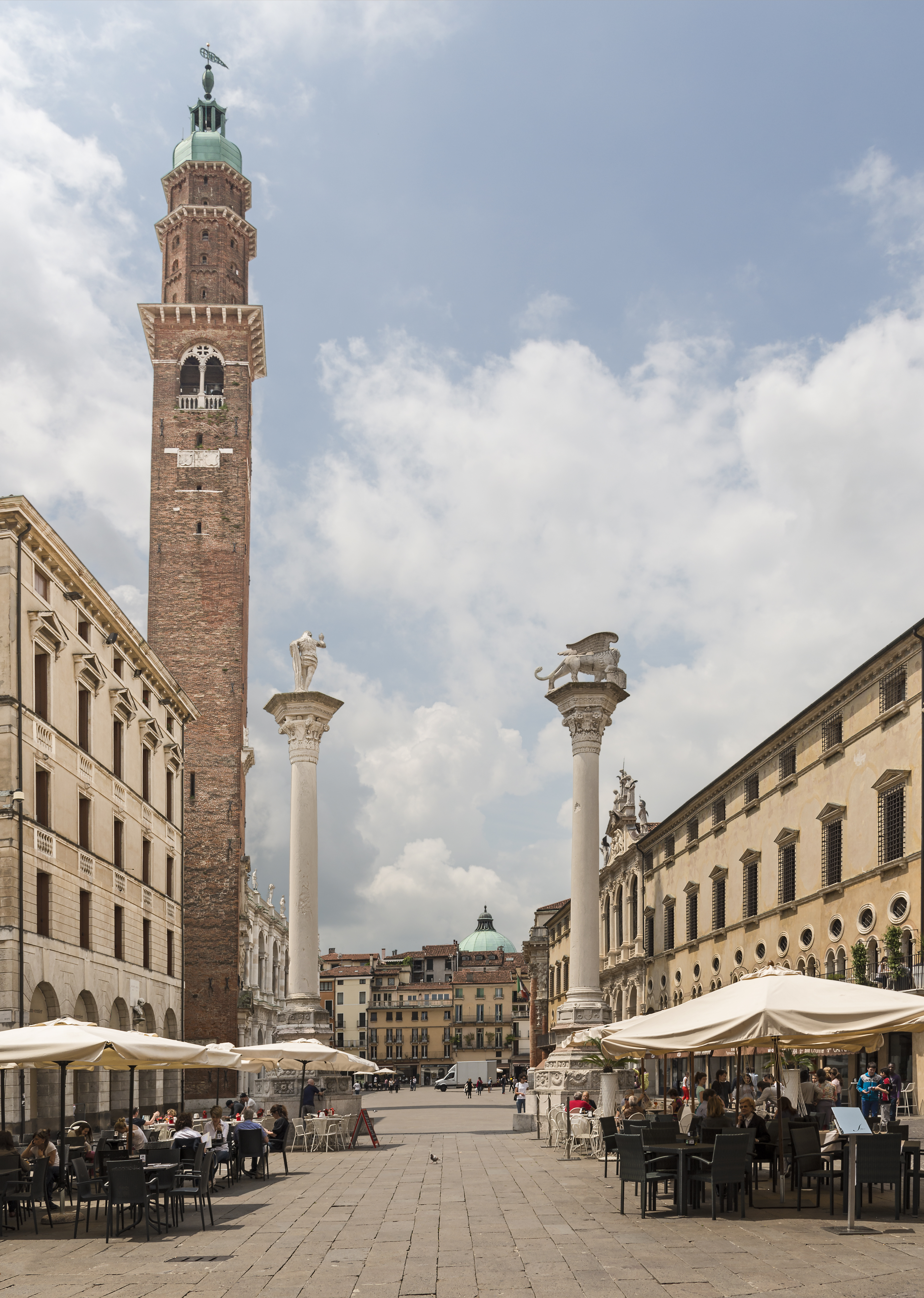
- Piazza dei Signori
- Interactive map of Vicenza
- Part of: City of Vicenza and the Palladian Villas of the Veneto
- Criteria: Cultural: i, ii
- Reference: 712-001
- Inscription: 1994 (18th Session)
- Area: 218 ha (540 acres)

Vicenza (/vɪˈtʃɛntsə/ vih-CHENT-sə, Italian: [viˈtʃɛntsa]; Venetian: Vicença or Vicensa [viˈtʃeŋsa], archaically Vixenza [viˈzeŋ(t)sa]) is a city in the region of Veneto in northern Italy. It lies at the northern base of the Monte Berico, where it straddles the River Bacchiglione. Vicenza is approximately 60 kilometres (37 mi) west of Venice and 200 kilometres (120 mi) east of Milan. With a population of 110,741 as of 2026, it is the 40th-largest city in Italy and the 4th-largest city in Veneto.

Vicenza is a city with a rich history and culture, and many museums, art galleries, piazzas, villas, churches and Renaissance palazzi. With the Palladian villas of the Veneto in the surrounding area, and the Teatro Olimpico ("Olympic Theater"), the "city of Palladio" has been listed as a UNESCO World Heritage Site since 1994.

Vicenza is the third-largest Italian industrial centre as measured by the value of its exports, and is one of the country's wealthiest cities, in large part due to its textile and steel industries, which employ tens of thousands of people. Additionally, about one fifth of the country's gold and jewelry is made in Vicenza, greatly contributing to the city's economy. Another important sector is the engineering/computer components industry (Federico Faggin, the microprocessor's co-inventor, was born in Vicenza).

== History ==
=== Roman era ===
Vicentia was settled by the Italic Euganei tribe and then by the Paleo-Veneti tribe in the 3rd and 2nd centuries BC. The Romans allied themselves with the Paleo-Veneti in their fight against the Celtic tribes that populated north-western Italy. The Roman presence in the area grew exponentially over time and the Paleo-Veneti (whose culture mirrored Etruscan and Greek values more so than Celtic ones) were gradually assimilated. In 157 BC, the city was a de facto Roman centre and was given the name of Vicetia or Vincentia, meaning "victorious".

The citizens of Vicetia received Roman citizenship and were inscribed into the Roman tribe Romilia in 49 BC. The city was known for its agriculture, brickworks, marble quarry, and wool industry and had some importance as a way-station on the important road from Mediolanum (Milan) to Aquileia, near Tergeste (Trieste), but it was overshadowed by its neighbor Patavium (Padua). Little survives of the Roman city, but three of the bridges across the Bacchiglione and Retrone rivers are of Roman origin, and isolated arches of a Roman aqueduct exist outside the Porta Santa Croce.

During the decline of the Western Roman Empire, Heruls, Vandals, Alaric and his Visigoths, as well as the Huns laid waste to the area, but the city recovered after the Ostrogoth conquest in 489 AD, before being conquered by the Byzantine Empire soon after. It was also an important Lombard city and then a Frankish center. Numerous Benedictine monasteries were built in the Vicenza area, beginning in the 6th century.

=== Middle Ages ===
In 899, Vicenza was destroyed by Magyar raiders.

In 1001, Otto III handed over the government of the city to the bishop, and its communal organization had an opportunity to develop, separating soon from the episcopal authority. It took an active part in the League with Verona and, most of all, in the Lombard League (1164–1167) against Emperor Frederick I Barbarossa compelling Padua and Treviso to join: its podestà, Ezzelino II il Balbo, was captain of the league. When peace was restored, however, the old rivalry with Padua, Bassano, and other cities was renewed, besides which there were the internal factions of the Vivaresi (Ghibellines) and the Maltraversi (Guelphs).

The tyrannical Ezzelino III from Bassano drove the Guelphs out of Vicenza, and caused his brother, Alberico, to be elected podestà in 1230. The independent commune joined the Second Lombard League against Emperor Frederick II who sacked the city in 1237, after which it was annexed to Ezzelino's dominions. On his death the old oligarchic republic political structure was restored – a consiglio maggiore ("grand council") of four hundred members and a consiglio minore ("small council") of forty members – and it formed a league with Padua, Treviso and Verona. Three years later the Vicentines entrusted the protection of the city to Padua, so as to safeguard republican liberty; but this protectorate (custodia) quickly became dominion, and for that reason Vicenza in 1311 submitted to the Scaligeri lords of Verona, who fortified it against the Visconti of Milan.

Vicenza came under the rule of the Republic of Venice in 1404, and its subsequent history is that of Venice. It was besieged by the Emperor Sigismund. In 1496, the podestà Antonio Bernardo expelled the Jews from Vicenza. Maximilian I held possession of Vicenza in 1509 and 1516.

=== Early modern era ===
Vicenza was selected as a candidate to host the Council of Trent.

The 16th century was the time of Andrea Palladio, who left many outstanding examples of his art with palaces and villas in the city's territory, which before Palladio's passage, was arguably the most downtrodden and esthetically lacking city in Veneto.

After the Fall of the Venetian Republic in 1797, under Napoleonic rule, it was made a duché grand-fief (not a grand duchy, but a hereditary (extinguished in 1896), nominal duchy, a rare honor reserved for French officials) within Napoleon's personal Kingdom of Italy for general Caulaincourt, also imperial Grand-Écuyer. One of the consequences of the city's occupation was the destruction of a prized silver model of the city, the Jewel of Vicenza.

=== 19th century and later ===
After 1814, Vicenza passed to the Austrian Empire. In 1848, however, the populace rose against Austria, more violently than in any other Italian centre apart from Milan and Brescia (the city would receive the highest award for military valour for the courage displayed by revolutionaries in this period). As a part of the Kingdom of Lombardy–Venetia, it was annexed to Italy after the Third Italian War of Independence.

Vicenza's area was a location of major combat in both World War I (on the Asiago plateau) and World War II (a focal center of the Italian resistance), and it was the most damaged city in Veneto by Allied bombings, including many of its monuments; the civil victims were over 2,000. The end of World War II was followed by a period of depression, caused by the devastation during the two world wars. In the 1960s, the whole central part of Veneto, witnessed a strong economic development caused by the emergence of small and medium family businesses, ranging in a vast array of products (that often emerged illegally) that paved the way for what would be known as the "miracolo del nord-est" ("miracle of the northeast"). In the following years, the economic development grew vertiginously. Huge industrial areas sprouted around the city, massive and disorganized urbanization and employment of foreign immigrants increased.

Vicenza is home to the US Army post Caserma Ederle (Camp Ederle), also known as the U.S. Army Garrison Vicenza. In 1965, Caserma Ederle became the headquarters of the Southern European Task Force, which includes the 173d Airborne Brigade. In January 2006, the European Gendarmerie Force was inaugurated in Vicenza.

== Geography ==
Vicenza lies in the Veneto region, at the northern base of Monte Berico, where it straddles the Bacchiglione River. Vicenza is approximately 60 kilometres (37 mi) west of Venice and 200 kilometres (120 mi) east of Milan.

=== Climate ===
Climate data for Vicenza (1981–2010 normals, extremes 1951–2008)
Month	Jan	Feb	Mar	Apr	May	Jun	Jul	Aug	Sep	Oct	Nov	Dec	Year
Record high °C (°F)	15.9 (60.6)	21.7 (71.1)	26.8 (80.2)	30.0 (86.0)	34.8 (94.6)	37.4 (99.3)	37.4 (99.3)	38.2 (100.8)	33.2 (91.8)	29.4 (84.9)	24.4 (75.9)	17.8 (64.0)	38.2 (100.8)
Mean daily maximum °C (°F)	7.2 (45.0)	9.2 (48.6)	13.9 (57.0)	18.0 (64.4)	23.7 (74.7)	27.1 (80.8)	29.7 (85.5)	29.2 (84.6)	24.7 (76.5)	18.7 (65.7)	12.2 (54.0)	8.1 (46.6)	18.5 (65.3)
Daily mean °C (°F)	2.9 (37.2)	4.2 (39.6)	8.6 (47.5)	12.6 (54.7)	18.0 (64.4)	21.6 (70.9)	24.0 (75.2)	23.4 (74.1)	19.2 (66.6)	14.0 (57.2)	7.8 (46.0)	3.8 (38.8)	13.3 (56.0)
Mean daily minimum °C (°F)	−1.4 (29.5)	−0.8 (30.6)	3.3 (37.9)	7.3 (45.1)	12.4 (54.3)	16.2 (61.2)	18.2 (64.8)	17.5 (63.5)	13.6 (56.5)	9.2 (48.6)	3.4 (38.1)	−0.4 (31.3)	8.2 (46.8)
Record low °C (°F)	−20 (−4)	−18.6 (−1.5)	−10 (14)	−3.2 (26.2)	−0.8 (30.6)	2.6 (36.7)	9.5 (49.1)	8.0 (46.4)	3.8 (38.8)	−3.6 (25.5)	−8 (18)	−13 (9)	−20.0 (−4.0)
Average precipitation mm (inches)	76.5 (3.01)	67.9 (2.67)	76.9 (3.03)	97.3 (3.83)	100.0 (3.94)	104.3 (4.11)	74.0 (2.91)	79.5 (3.13)	92.7 (3.65)	115.5 (4.55)	93.7 (3.69)	81.5 (3.21)	1,059.8 (41.73)
Average precipitation days (≥ 1.0 mm)	7.0	5.0	6.4	9.5	10.0	9.3	6.8	6.7	6.1	7.5	7.1	6.4	87.8
Average relative humidity (%)	81	77	73	74	72	73	72	73	74	78	80	82	76
Source 1: Istituto Superiore per la Protezione e la Ricerca Ambientale
Source 2: Servizio Meteorologico (precipitation 1971–2000, humidity 1961–1990)

== Demographics ==
Historical population
Year	Pop.	±%
1871	37,475	—
1881	38,713	+3.3%
1901	43,703	+12.9%
1911	53,107	+21.5%
1921	59,611	+12.2%
1931	64,372	+8.0%
1936	69,379	+7.8%
1951	79,862	+15.1%
1961	98,019	+22.7%
1971	116,620	+19.0%
1981	114,598	−1.7%
1991	107,454	−6.2%
2001	107,223	−0.2%
2011	111,500	+4.0%
2021	110,293	−1.1%
Source: ISTAT

As of 2026, the population is 110,741, of which 48.5% are males, and 51.5% are females. Minors make up 13.9% of the population, and seniors make up 25.5%.

=== Immigration ===
As of 2025, immigrants make up 19.9% of the population. The 5 largest foreign countries of birth are Moldova, Serbia, Romania, Albania, and Pakistan.

== Sights ==
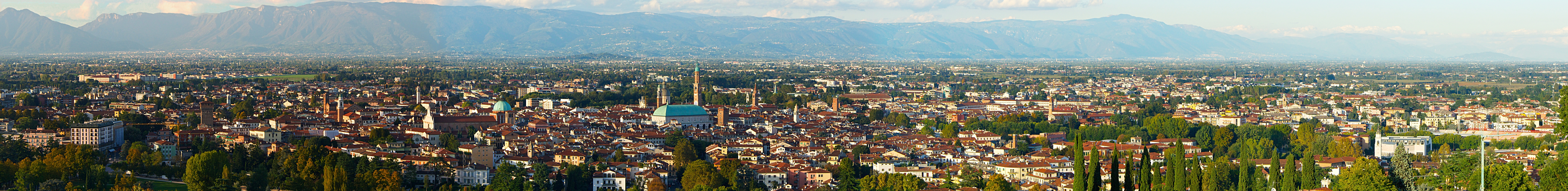
Panoramic view from Monte Berico

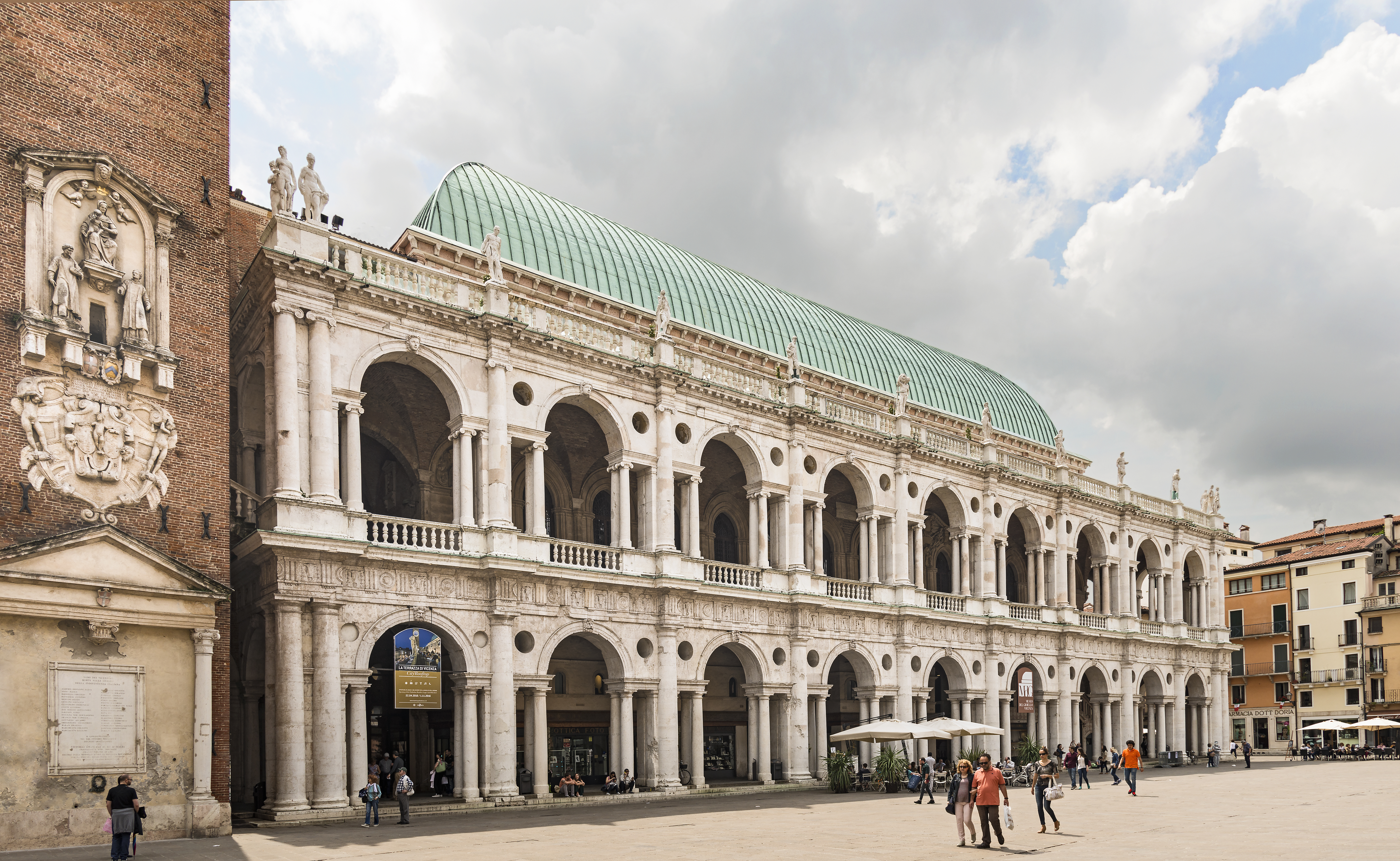
Basilica Palladiana

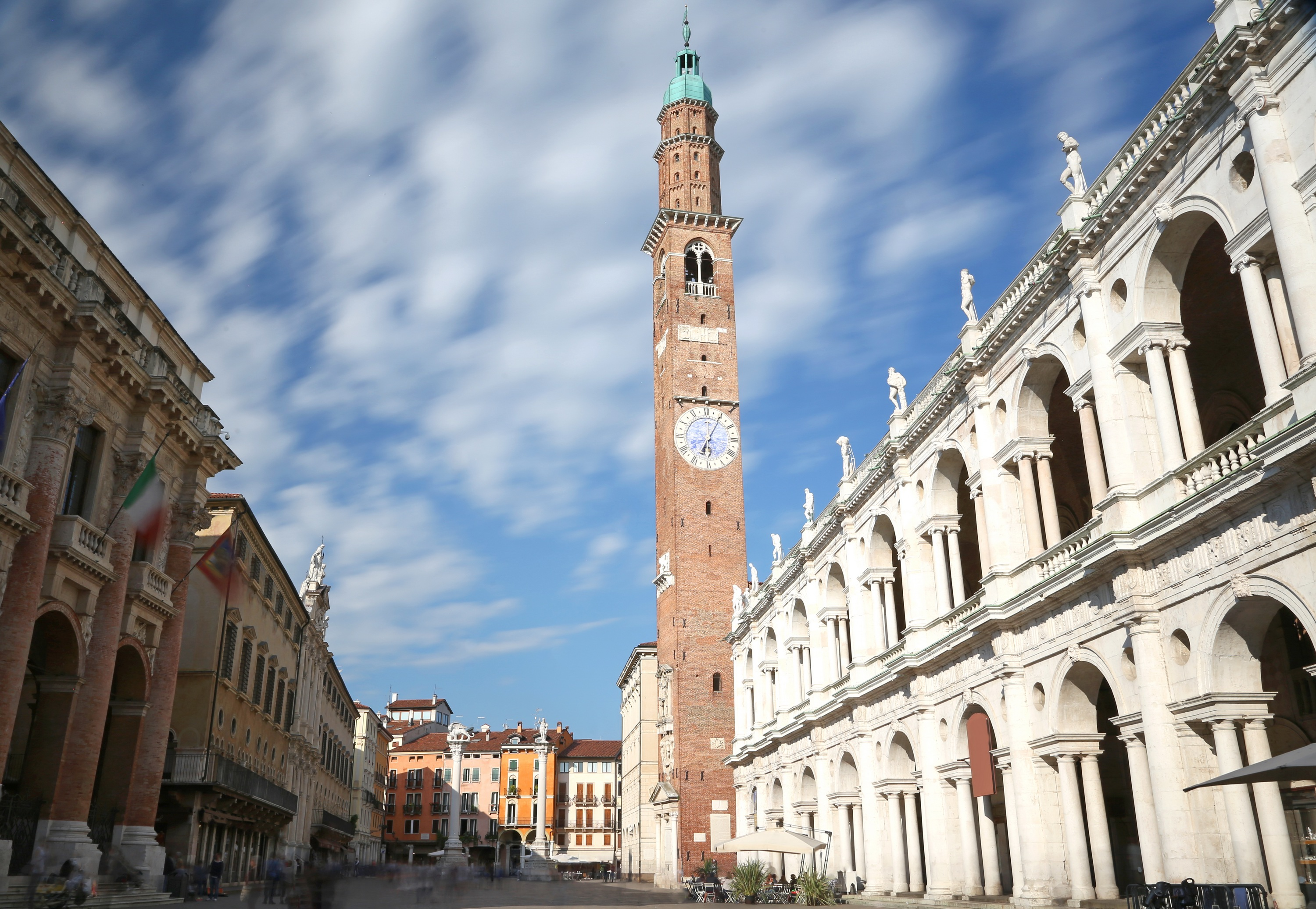
Basilica Palladiana with clock tower

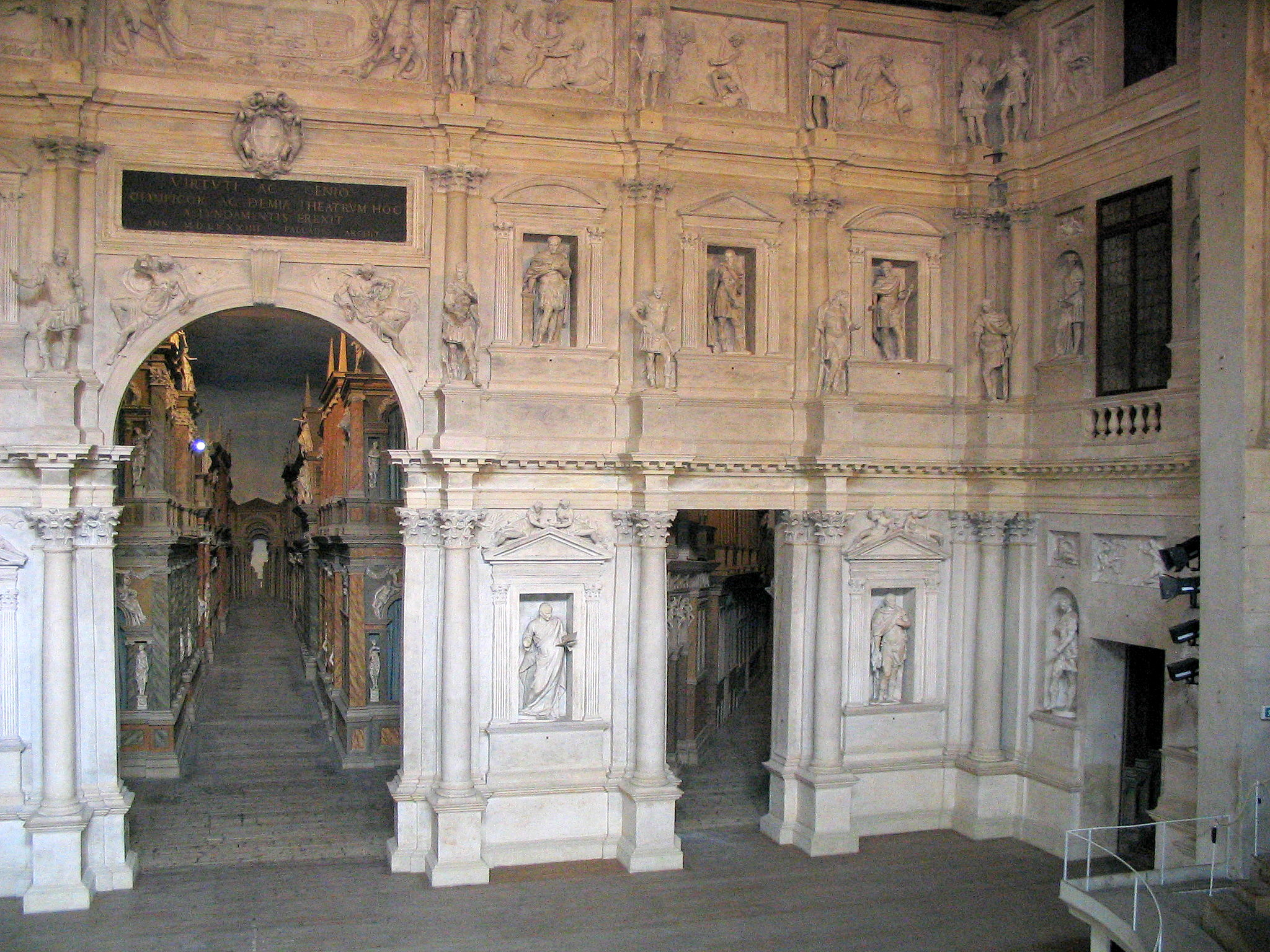
The three-dimensional stage of the Teatro Olimpico in Vicenza

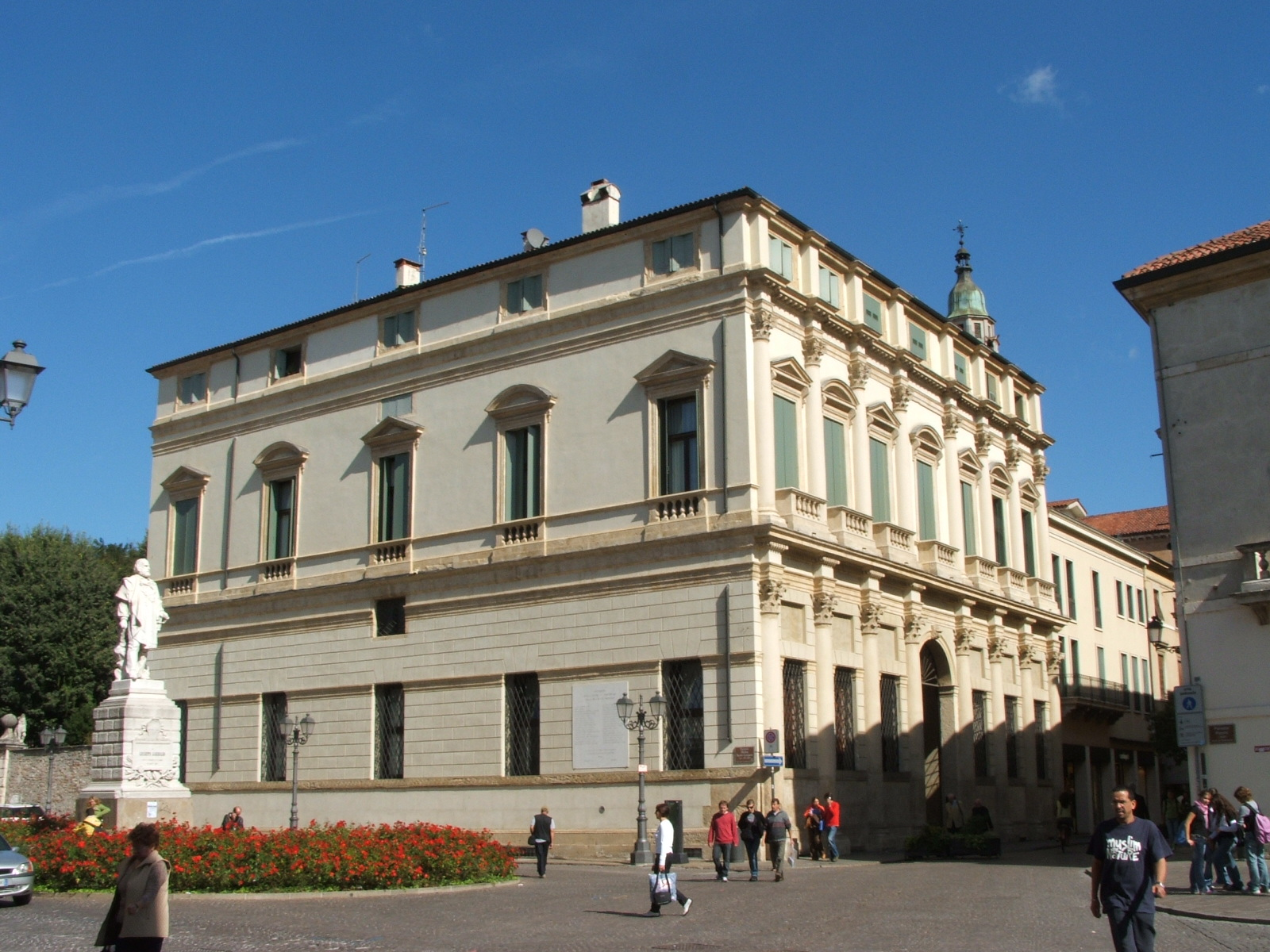
Palazzo Thiene Bonin Longare, designed by Palladio and built by Vincenzo Scamozzi

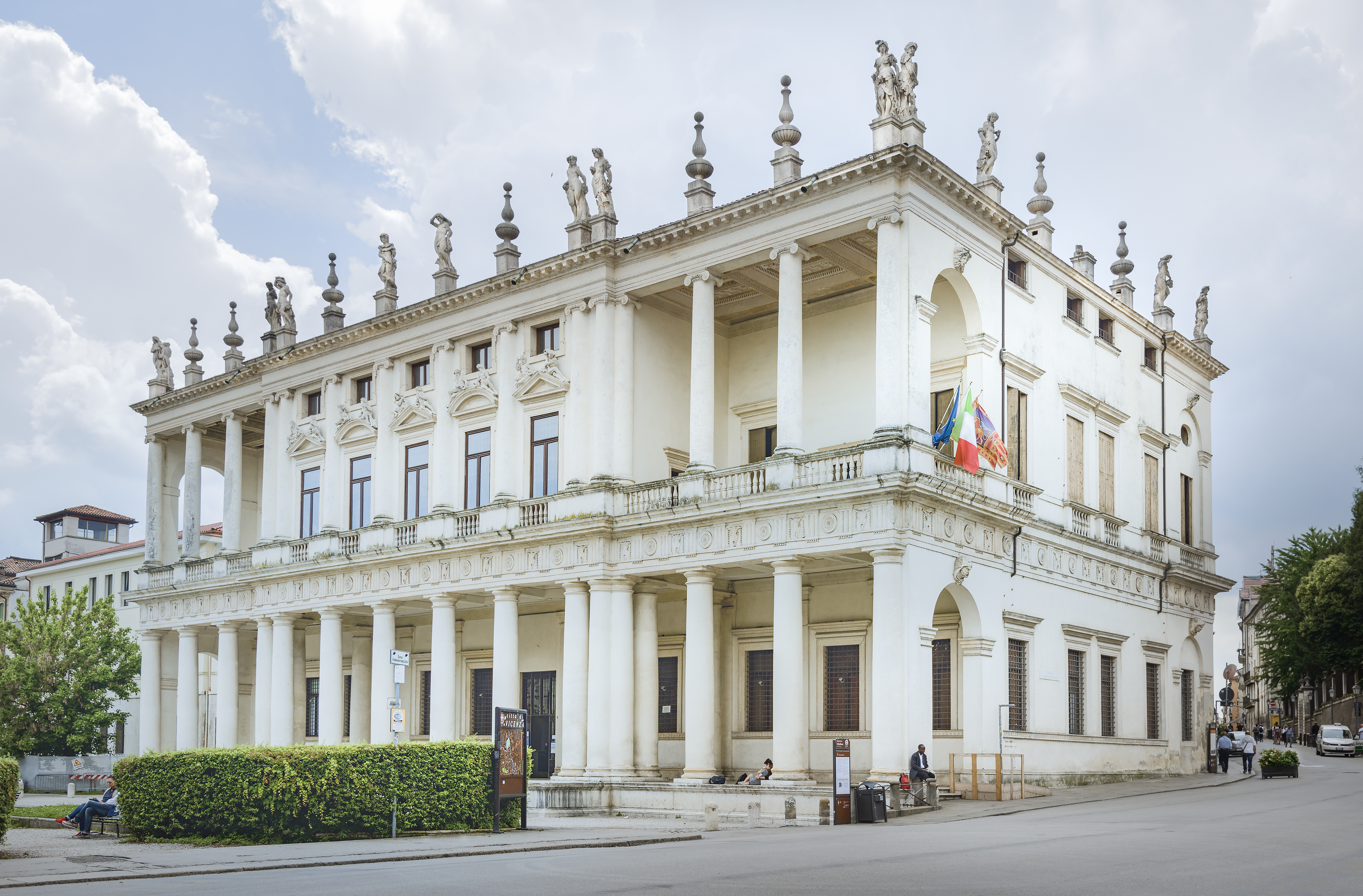
Palazzo Chiericati

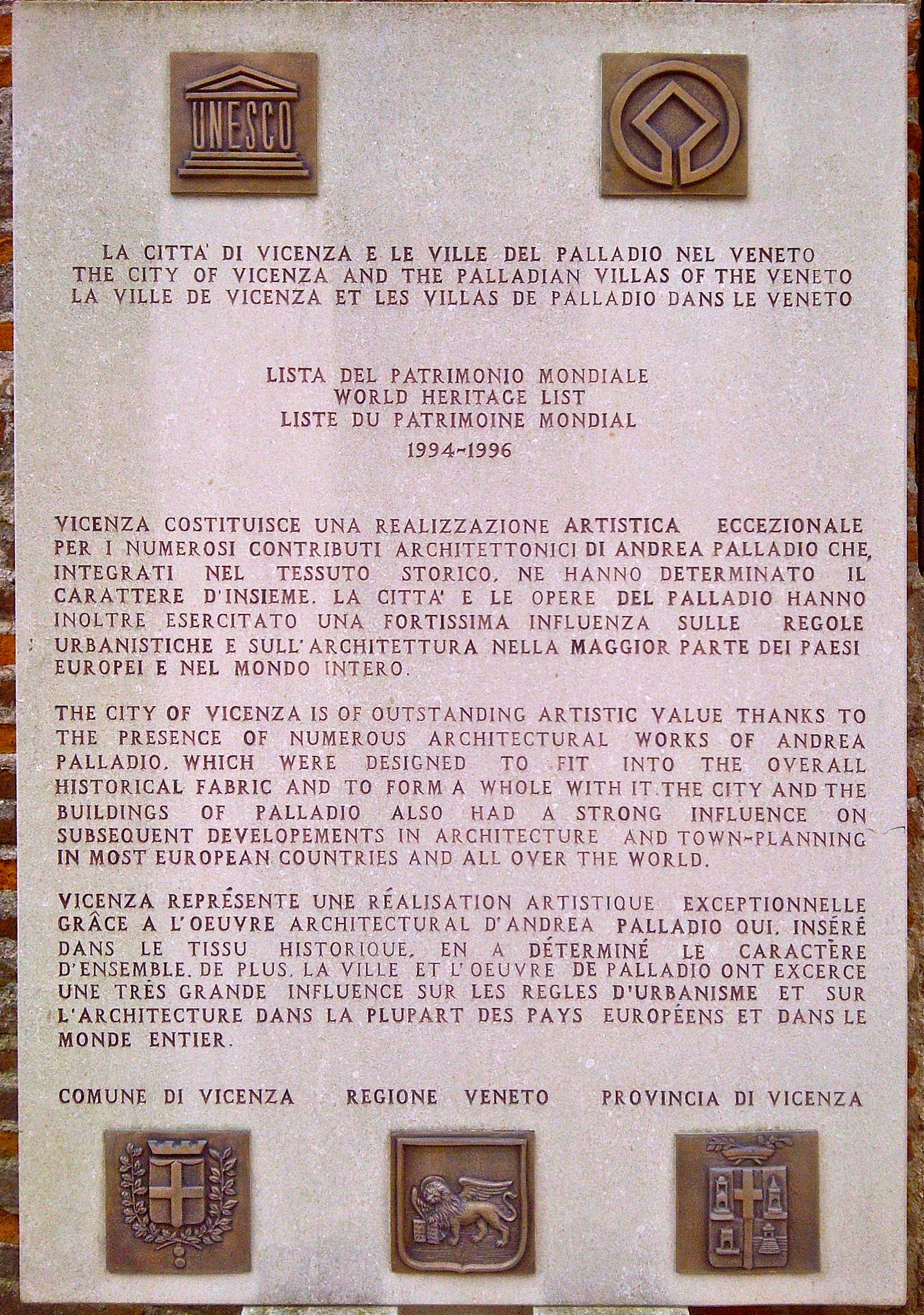
Plaque for Vicenza in the UNESCO World Heritage List

In 1994 UNESCO inscribed "Vicenza, City of Palladio" on its list of World Heritage Sites. In 1996, the site was expanded to include the Palladian villas outside the core area, and accordingly renamed "City of Vicenza and the Palladian Villas of the Veneto".

=== Palladio's works ===
Vicenza is home to twenty-three buildings designed by Palladio. Famous examples include:

- Basilica Palladiana, centrally located in Vicenza's Piazza dei Signori, of which Palladio himself said that "it might stand comparison with any similar work of antiquity"
- Teatro Olimpico, designed for the Accademia Olimpica (Olympic Academy) and begun to be built in 1580, when Palladio died. The wooden scenes are by Vincenzo Scamozzi.
- Villa Almerico Capra (also known as "La Rotonda"), located just outside the downtown area
- Palazzo Chiericati, home of the city pinacotheca
- Palazzo Barbaran da Porto, home of the Museo Palladio
- Palazzo del Capitaniato, home of the city council
- Palazzo Porto
- Palazzo Porto in Piazza Castello (incomplete)
- Palazzo Thiene Bonin Longare (built by Vincenzo Scamozzi)
- Palazzo Thiene
- Villa Gazzotti Grimani, in the frazione Bertesina

=== Other sights ===
==== Churches ====
Some of the main historical churches:

- Cathedral of Vicenza (church of Santa Maria Annunciata), dating from early in the 11th century, and restored in the 13th, 16th, 19th and after the ruinous destruction of World War II, possesses a number of paintings and sculptures, nearly all of them by Vicentine artists; the dome and north side door were designed by Andrea Palladio.
- Basilica Sanctuary of Saint Mary of Monte Berico: the structure was completed in two stages, creating two churches in different styles: the first in 1428 in Gothic style, the second in 1703 by Carlo Borella, designed as a late-baroque style basilica. The adjacent convent, houses The Supper of Saint Gregory the Great, a large canvas by Paolo Veronese. The bell tower (1826) was designed by Antonio Piovene. The basilica commemorates two apparitions of Our Lady to Vincenza Pasini, a pious woman who lived in a village in the province, and the liberation of the city from a terrible plague.
- Basilica of Santi Felice and Fortunato: church built in the 4th century within a Roman cemetery and expanded in the 5th century to house the relics of the martyrs Felice and Fortunato. In the 9th century, the city, and the church, were razed by the Hungarians; by the 10th century, the church had been re-erected by the bishop Rodolfo with the support of Emperor Otto II. It has the layout of a paleochristian basilica, initially rectangular, then doubled in width and divided into three naves. After the Hungarian invasions, the Benedictines built a new baptistery and the semicircular apse, adding the bell tower and the rosette, as well as a series of blind arches and a Byzantine cross in front. In later centuries, the interiors underwent a radical alteration, enriching it with Baroque altars and decorations. A 20th century restoration removed many of these embellishments. Next to the church there is a small museum exhibition with archaeological finds from the church and from the nearby Roman necropolis.
- Santa Corona: one of the oldest and most important churches of the city, this 13th century church first endowed by the bishop of Verona, the Blessed Bartholomew of Breganze, to shelter one of the thorns from Christ's crown. It was under the purview of the Dominicans after the death of Ezzelino III da Romano. It houses paintings by Montagna (The Magdelene), Bellini (Baptism of Christ) and others; the crypt hosts the Valmarana chapel by Palladio. The church underwent a major restoration in 2012.
- San Giorgio in Gogna: one of the oldest churches in the city, built before the year 1000 with a Romanesque façade. The outer walls consist of agglomerates of different materials (brick, stone, marble salvaged from other buildings) are clearly a demonstration of the origin of the construction craft, which can be seen especially in the polygonal apse. It was restored by the diocese in 2011.
- San Lorenzo (1280): church built by Conventual Franciscans, also known as minorites, in mixed Gothic and Lombard Romanesque styles. Located along Corso Fogazzaro facing the central Piazza San Lorenzo, it hosts the tombs of illustrious Vicentines and is served by the Conventual Franciscans.
- Santa Maria Nova: late 16th-century church is the only religious architecture designed and built by Palladio in Vicenza, apart from the Valmarana chapel and the limited interventions in the cathedral.
- Santa Maria in Araceli (1244): church later refurbished by Guarini in Baroque style, formerly belonged to the Clarisses, contains statues by Orazio Marinali and Cassetti, and the reproductions of original altarpieces by Piazzetta and Tiepolo (now at the Pinacotheca Civica).
- Santa Maria of the Servites (Vicenza)|Santa Maria of the Servites: church in Piazza Biade adjacent to the Piazza dei Signori, was commissioned in the early 15th century by the order of the Servants of Mary. The church portal was executed in the studio where Andrea Palladio worked at the beginning of his career and would be one of his earliest works. In the cloister, in 1319, the miracles of St. Philip Benizi de Damiani took place.
- Santa Maria Etiopissa (1154): a simple stone and brick structure church.
- San Marco in San Girolamo (early 18th century): late baroque church built by the Discalced Carmelites on a previous convent and church of the Jesuati. The architect is unknown, but inside it is clear the influence of the style of the Venetian Giorgio Massari. After the Napoleonic abolition of the religious orders and their convents, it became in 1810 the church of San Marco, one of the oldest parishes in the city. It hosts many works by Vicentine and Venetian artists of the early 18th century, including some masterpieces. The sacristy preserves the complete original furniture of the time.
- San Vincenzo: church dedicated to Saint Vincent of Saragossa – ancient patron of Vicenza – overlooks Piazza dei Signori, facing the Basilica Palladiana, interrupting the smooth texture of the Palazzo del Monte di Pietà. The church was built between the 14th and the 18th centuries. The baroque façade (1614–1617) hosts two lodges with three arches, in Corinthian and composite style. The lodges are surmounted by a crown with Christ mourned by angels by Giambattista Albamese, also author of the five statues in the pediment. Behind the lodge there is the ancient church of 1387, offset in relation to the building that has incorporated, with the altar facing east. The interior of the church, as amended in 1499 and again in the 18th century by Francesco Muttoni, was restored in the 1920s. It hosts the ark of Simone Sarego (14th century), the impressive altar, rococo work of Bernardo Tabacco, and the altar of Pietà, masterpiece of a young Orazio Marinali (1689). Within the porch, a red marble stele is engraved with the ancient official linear measures of the Community of Vicenza.
- Sant'Agostino: church built upon older buildings in the 14th century, the ancient convent of Saint Augustine is located on the western outskirts of the city, giving its name to the parish and to the frazione. The abbey church was rebuilt in Romanesque style during the rule of Cangrande della Scala between 1322 and 1357. The church has a rich decoration and a large altarpiece of 1404 by Battista da Vicenza.
- Oratory of San Nicola da Tolentino: finished in 1678 on commission of the fraternity of St. Nicholas, it is a chapel that houses a series of paintings focused on the life of the saint, among the highest levels of the measured Baroque of Vicenza.
- The Churches of the Carmini (1372) and St. Catherine (1292), formerly belonging to the Humiliati, possess notable pictures.
- Santa Croce (1179)
- Santi Filippo and Giacomo (12th century)
- Church and Monastery of St. Peter

==== Secular buildings ====
- The Torre Bissara (clock tower) (1174), at 82 meters high, is one of the tallest buildings.
- The Biblioteca Civica Bertoliana, a public library founded by Count Giovanni M. Bertolo and opened in 1708
- Casa Pigafetta (1440), house of Antonio Pigafetta
- The Pinacotheca Civica houses mainly Vicentine paintings in the Palladian Palazzo Chiericati.

== Cuisine ==
Vicenza's cuisine reflects its humble, agricultural past: simple, hearty meals made with fresh local ingredients that reflect the province's geographical diversity.

Unlike Venetian cuisine where fish reigns supreme, game meat, cheeses and vegetables take center stage accompanied by polenta, soft from the stove or day-old sliced and grilled over the fireplace embers, better yet cooked in a pan under the spit where it lightly fries in meat drippings to create a crunchy golden outer crust.

Vicenza is known for its simple dishes, and often famous cheeses, fruits, ingredients and wines, such as sopressa vicentina, Asiago cheese, Marostica cherries, Nanto truffles, Bassano del Grappa asparagus and Breganze Cabernet wine.

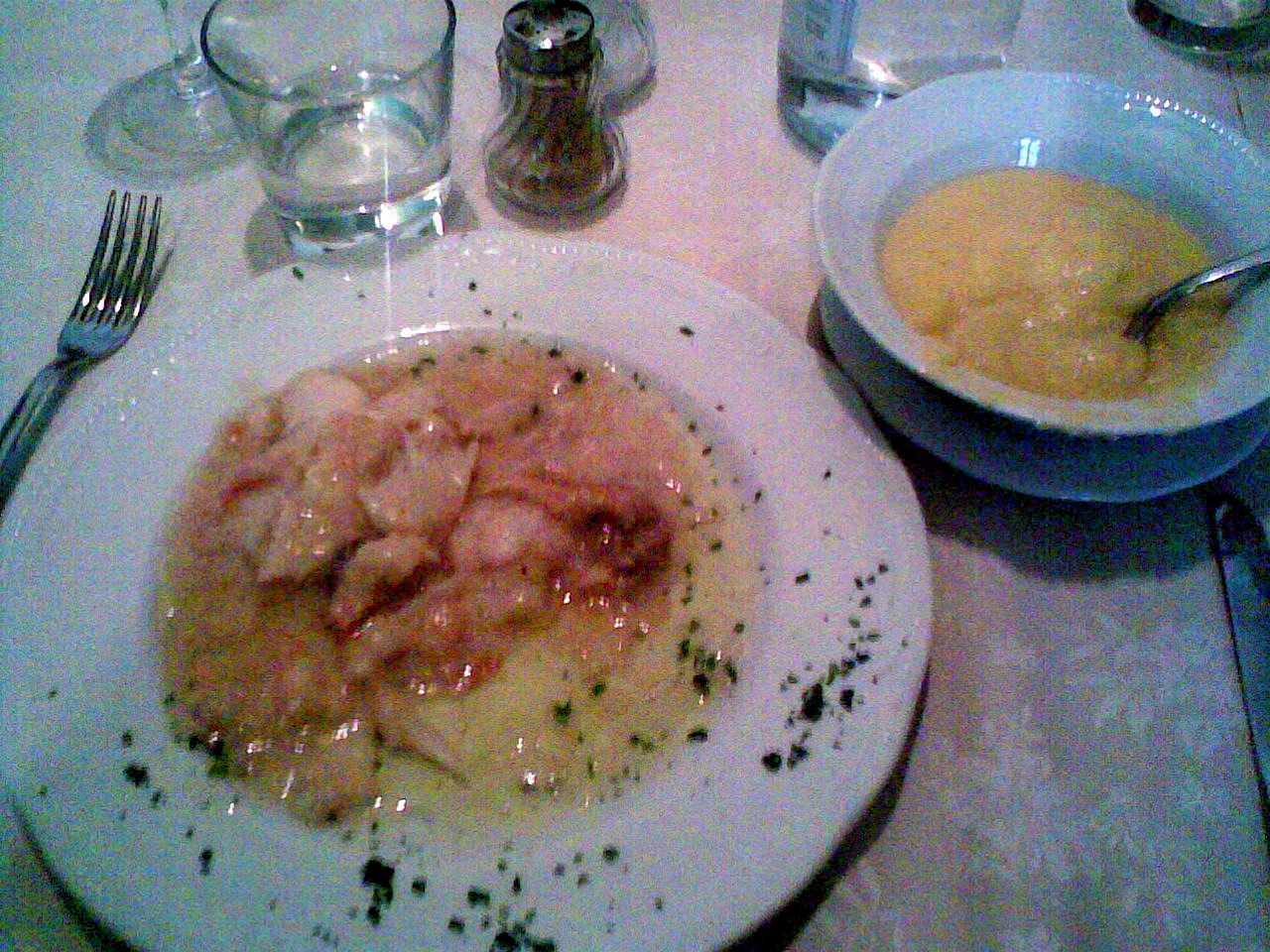
A plate of baccalà alla vicentina, a typical dish of the city

- Baccalà alla vicentina
- Risi e bisi (rice and green peas)
- Polenta e Osei
- Bigoli all'arna (thick fresh egg noodles with duck ragout)
- Putana (in this case not the vulgar term meaning "whore", but a fruit cake traditionally made with poor ingredients such as old bread or polenta and dried fruit such as raisins)

The inhabitants of Vicenza are jokingly referred to by other Italians as mangiagatti, or "cat eaters". Purportedly, Vicentini turned to cats for sustenance during times of famine, such as during World War II.

== Economy ==
The surrounding country is predominantly agricultural. Major products are wine, wheat, corn, olive oil (in the Barbarano area) and cherries and asparagus are a particularity of Bassano. There are also quarries of marble, sulphur, copper, and silver mines, and beds of lignite and kaolin; mineral springs also abound, the most famous being those of Recoaro.

Massive industrial areas surround the city and extend extensively in the western and eastern hinterland, with numerous steel and textile factories located in the Montecchio Maggiore, Chiampo and Sovizzo area in the west and Camisano Vicentino and Torri di Quartesolo in the east, areas characterised by a disorganised and extensive cementifaction.

Elite sectors are the jewelry and clothing factories. Important vicentino clothing firms include: Diesel, Pal Zileri, Marzotto, Bottega Veneta, Marlboro Classics etc. The Gold Exposition is world-famous and it takes place in Vicenza twice a year (January and September).

Other industries worthy of mention are the woollen and silk, pottery, tanneries, and musical instruments. The headquarters of the bicycle component manufacturer Campagnolo and the protective wear for sports manufacturer Dainese are located here.

== Libraries ==
- Biblioteca Civica Bertoliana, a public library founded by Count Giovanni M. Bertolo and opened in 1708
- International Library La Vigna, a specialized library

== Transport ==
Vicenza railway station, opened in 1846, forms part of the Milan–Venice railway, and is also a junction of two branch lines, to Schio and Treviso.

== Sport ==
The city is home to professional football club L.R. Vicenza, which currently compete in Serie C. Their home venue is the Stadio Romeo Menti with a capacity of 12,000.

Vicenza is home to Vicenza Hurricanes American Football team which currently plays in League 2. Founded in 2009, the Hurricanes have a junior team and a senior team with a roster of 35+ athletes.

Vicenza is also home to Rangers Rugby Vicenza, a rugby union team who compete in Serie A Elite.

== Notable people ==
- The Bloody Beetroots, band
- Amy Adams, American actress
- Lewis Albanese, Medal of Honor recipient during Vietnam War
- Giovanni Maria Angiolello, traveller and historian
- Francesco Aviani, painter
- Giuseppina Bakhita, saint
- Roberto Baggio, football player
- Luca Bassanese, singer
- Valerio Belli, sculptor and engraver
- Maria Bertilla Boscardin, saint
- Miki Biasion, rally driver
- Marzia Bisognin, YouTube celebrity
- Gelindo Bordin, athlete
- Roberto Busa, religious and informatic engineer
- Aulus Caecina Alienus, Roman general
- Gentullio "Tullio" Campagnolo, bicycle component maker and inventor
- Francesco Chieregati, papal nuncio and bishop
- Bartolomeo Cittadella, painter
- Carlo Cracco, chef and television personality
- Luigi Da Porto, writer
- Alby Sabrina Pretto, ballerina
- Ilvo Diamanti, political scientist
- Federico Faggin, inventor
- Adolfo Farsari, photographer
- Ferreto dei Ferreti, historian (14th century)
- Antonio Fogazzaro, writer
- Jessie James, singer
- Niccolò Leoniceno, medic
- Paolo Lioy, naturalist
- Luigi Meneghello, writer (professor at University of Reading)
- Romeo Menti, football player of the Grande Torino, died in the Superga air disaster
- Francesco Muttoni, architect
- Alessandro Oltramari, AI Researcher and President of the Carnegie Bosch Institute
- Andrea Palladio, architect
- Goffredo Parise, writer
- Marco Pelle, choreographer, director
- Antonio Pigafetta, explorer, companion of Ferdinand Magellan
- Guido Piovene, journalist and writer
- Joseph Pivato, Canadian writer and academic, born in Tezze sul Brenta
- Orlando Pizzolato, athlete
- Sergio Romano, diplomat and historian
- Paolo Rossi, football player
- Mariano Rumor, politician
- Sonia Gandhi, Indian politician, wife of former Indian Prime Minister Rajiv Gandhi
- Flo Sandon's, singer
- Vincenzo Scamozzi, architect
- Sharon Tate, American actress and model. She attended Vicenza American High School.
- Tiziano Treu, politician
- Vitaliano Trevisan, writer and actor
- Gian Giorgio Trissino, humanist and poet
- Antonio Turra, botanist and physician
- Guido Vedovato, painter
- Nicola Vicentino, theorist and composer
- Bruno Zamborlin, AI researcher
- Giacomo Zanella, writer and priest

== International relations ==
=== Twin towns – sister cities ===
Vicenza is twinned with:

- Annecy, France, since 1995
- Pforzheim, Germany, since 1991
- Wuxi, China, since 2006
- (United States) Cleveland, Ohio, U.S., since 2009

== See also ==
- Sartori family
- Roman Catholic Diocese of Vicenza
