= Palazzo Paradiso =

Coordinates: 44°49′58″N 11°37′18″E

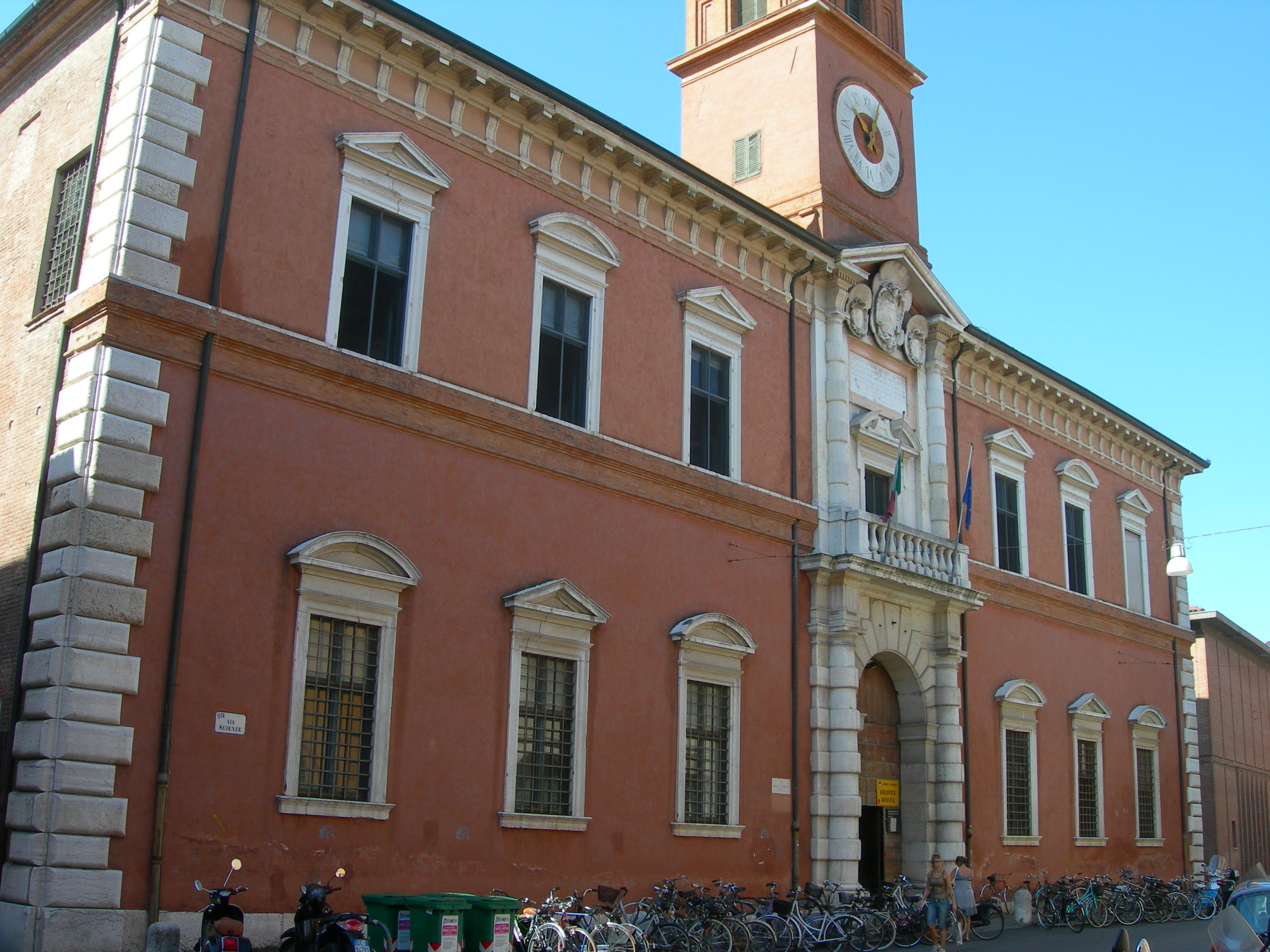

General information
- Location: Ferrara, Italy

The Palazzo Paradiso is a Renaissance palace located on Via Scienze #17 in the medieval center of Ferrara, region of Emilia-Romagna, Italy. Adjacent to the historic Jewish ghetto of Ferrara, it houses:

- Anatomical Theater of Ferrara
- Sala Ariosto—mausoleum of the writer Ludovico Ariosto
- Biblioteca Comunale Ariostea—a historical library and archive of Ferrara

== History ==
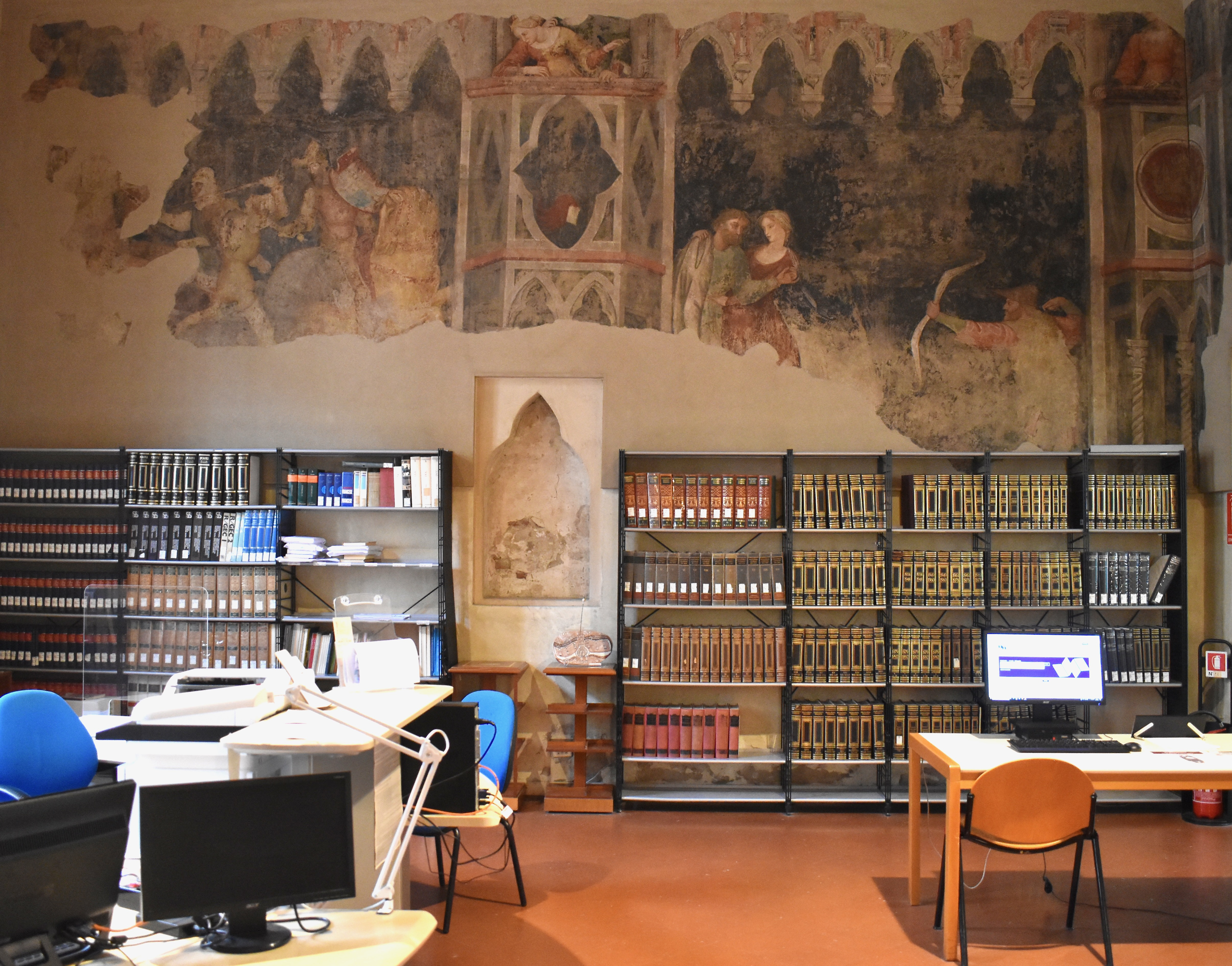
Master of Palazzo Paradiso, frescoes in the Hall of Hercules, (1391-1410 ca.)

The palace was erected in 1391 by Alberto V d'Este on the occasion of his marriage with Giovanna de Roberti. Like a number of other Quattrocento palaces, such as the Schifanoia and the Belfiore, the building was frescoed by Antonio Alberti, here depicting scenes of courtly life and romances. He also painted a large fresco, now destroyed, of Paradise for the 1437–38 ecumenical council, during which the palace housed the emperor of Constantinople (John VIII Palaiologos) and Pope Eugene IV. Of the former three loggias of the palace, only one remains.

In the 15th century, the palace had only one floor. In 1567, the dukes converted the building to house university offices, and a second floor was added by Giovanni Battista Aleotti, who also relocated the facade to the via delle Scienze, where the portal was surmounted by a small clock tower, designed (1610) by Alessandro Balbi and Aleotti.

== Anatomical Theater ==
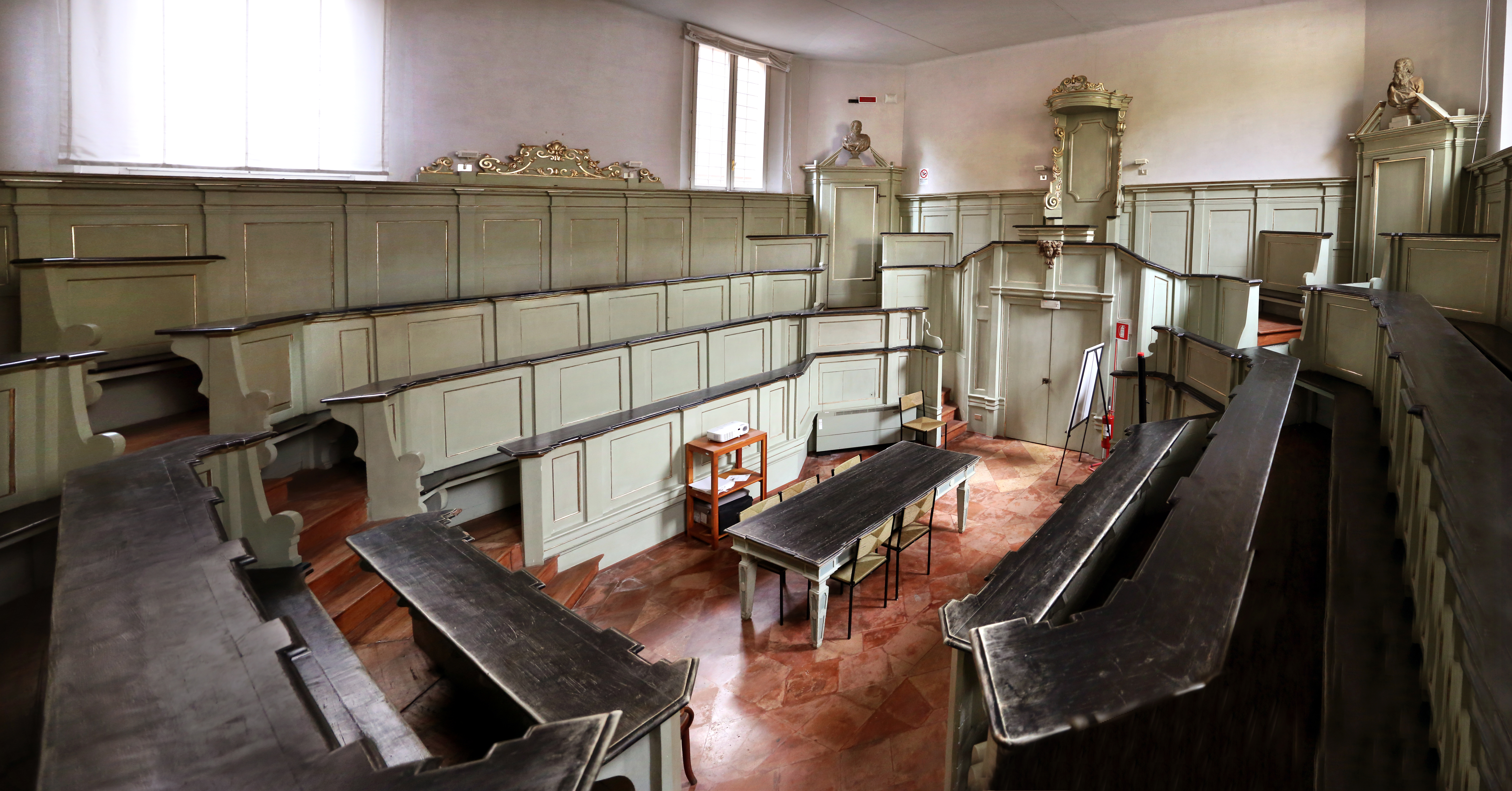
Anatomical theater

In 1731, the anatomist Giacinto Agnelli and the architect Francesco Mazzarelli constructed the still existing anatomical theatre. The shape echoes elements of the theaters in Padua (1594) and the Archiginnasio of Bologna (1636). The room is octagonal and illuminated by four large windows. Separate entrances allow for the entry of students, teachers, and cadavers. In 1831, the medical faculty moved to the Arcispedale Santa Anna, and the theater was relegated to chemistry lessons.

== Sala Ariosto ==
In 1801, the relics of Ludovico Ariosto were moved from the then-deconsecrated church of San Benedetto to a refurbished mausoleum within the palace, commissioned by a grandson of the poet and designed by Aleotti, which is now called the Sala Ariosto.

The grand staircase in the building was designed by Foschini. The ceiling of the Sala Ariosto is frescoed, and in the cornice medallions depict the founders of the library. On a niche with polychrome marble rise four columns and an alabaster bust of the poet. Surmounted by garlands of fruit, the monument is flanked by statues of Poetry and Fame.

== Biblioteca Ariostea ==
The library, founded in 1750 and refurbished in 1801, according to a plaque in the reading room, is dedicated to manuscripts and publications related to local writers such as Ariosto, Tasso, Monti, Govoni, Caretti, and Quilici. The collection has nearly 400,000 objects. The restored reading room is now dedicated to the bibliophile Giovanni Maria Riminaldi.
