= Anatomical theatre of the Archiginnasio =

Historic medical lecture hall in Bologna, Italy

Coordinates: 44°29′32″N 11°20′37″E

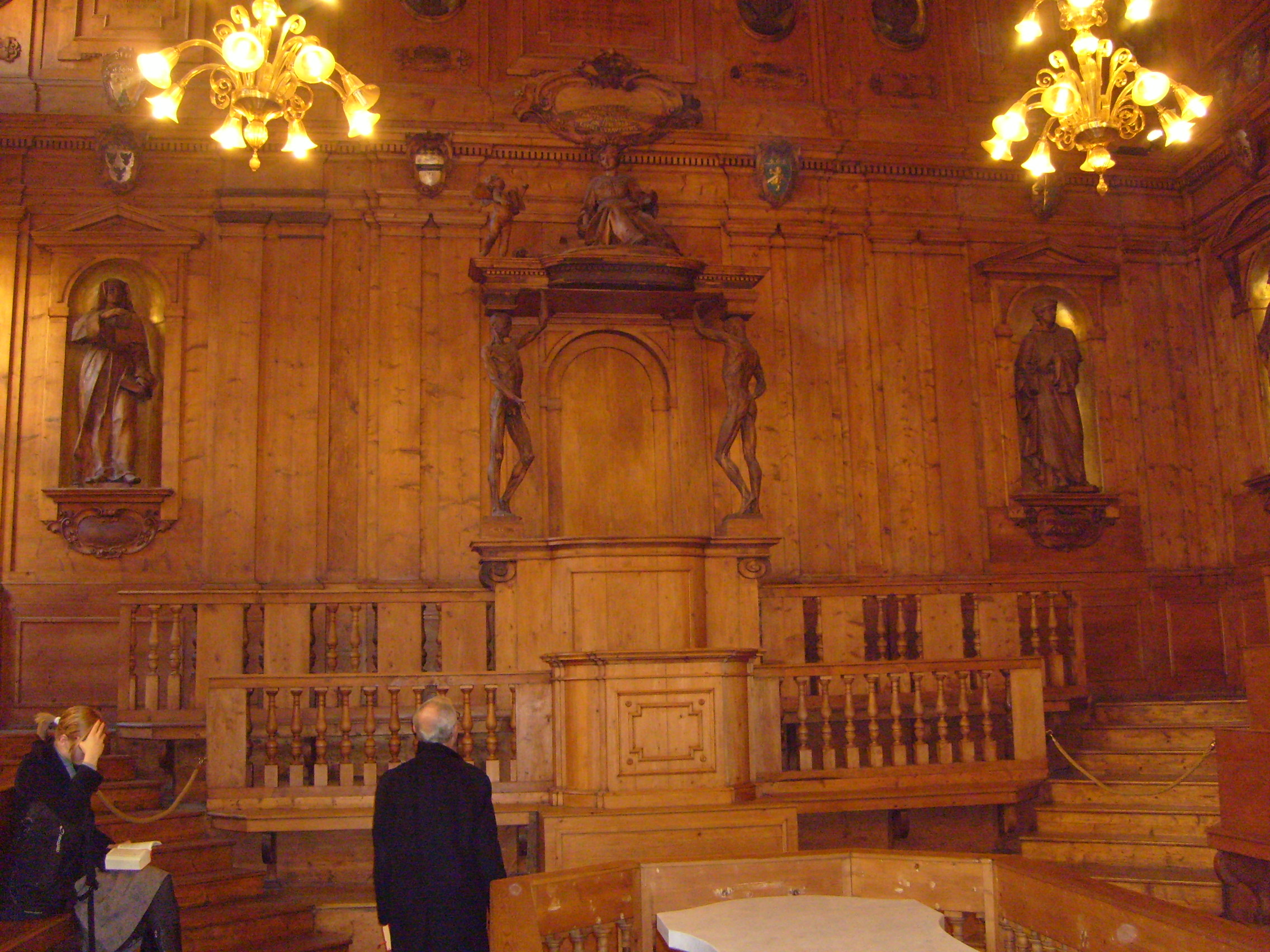
A general view of the reconstructed Anatomical theatre

The Anatomical Theatre of the Archiginnasio is a hall once used for anatomy lectures and displays held at the medical school in Bologna, Italy that used to be located in the Palace of the Archiginnasio, the first unified seat of the University of Bologna. A first anatomical theatre was constructed in 1595, in a different location, but it was replaced by a bigger one built in 1637 in the current location, following the design of the architect Antonio Levanti. The ceiling and the wall decoration were completed from 1647 to 1649 but only the lacunar ceiling dates from this period, with the figure of Apollo, the god of Medicine, in the middle, surrounded by symbolic images of constellations carved in wood.

The theatre underwent several modifications and reached its final shape between 1733 and 1736. In this period, Silvestro Giannotti carved the wooden statues which decorate the theatre walls. They represent some famous physicians of ancient times (Hippocrates, Galenus, etc.) and of the local athenaeum (Mondino de Liuzzi, Gasparo Tagliacozzi-holding a nose in his hand, as he had been the first to attempt reconstructive plastic surgery). The two famous statues of the “Spellati” (skinned) are the work of the well-known artist of anatomical wax displays, Ercole Lelli. The statues carry the canopy, surmounting the teacher’s chair, and topped by the allegorical image of Anatomy. In the centre of the theatre stands the white table on which the dissection of human or animal bodies took place.

The theatre was almost completely destroyed during the Second World War, by an air raid on January 29, 1944. After the war the Theatre was rebuilt with exemplary philological rigour, using all of the original pieces recovered among the rubble of the building.

== Gallery ==
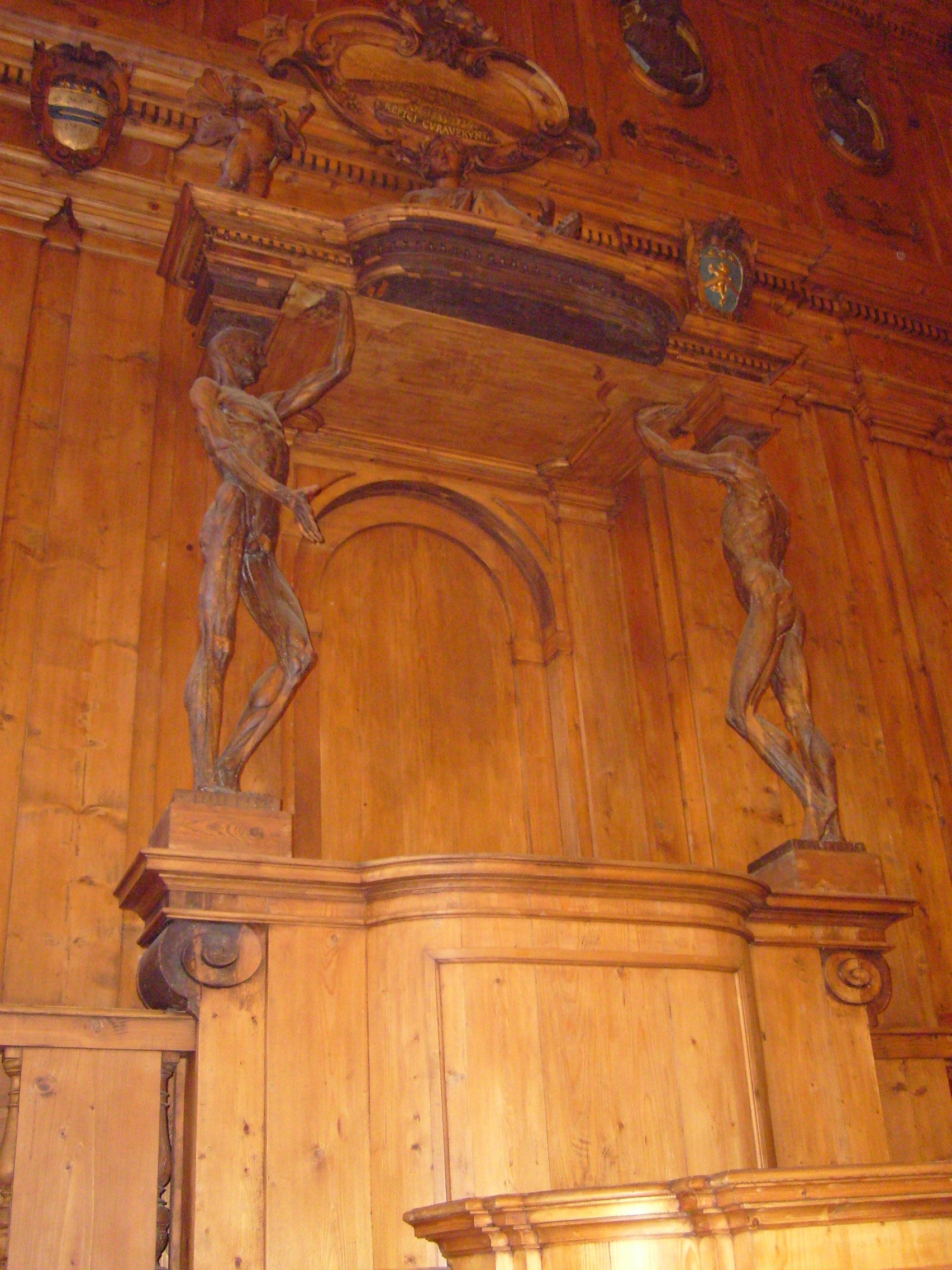
The teacher's chair and the statues of the ‘Spellati’ (skinned)

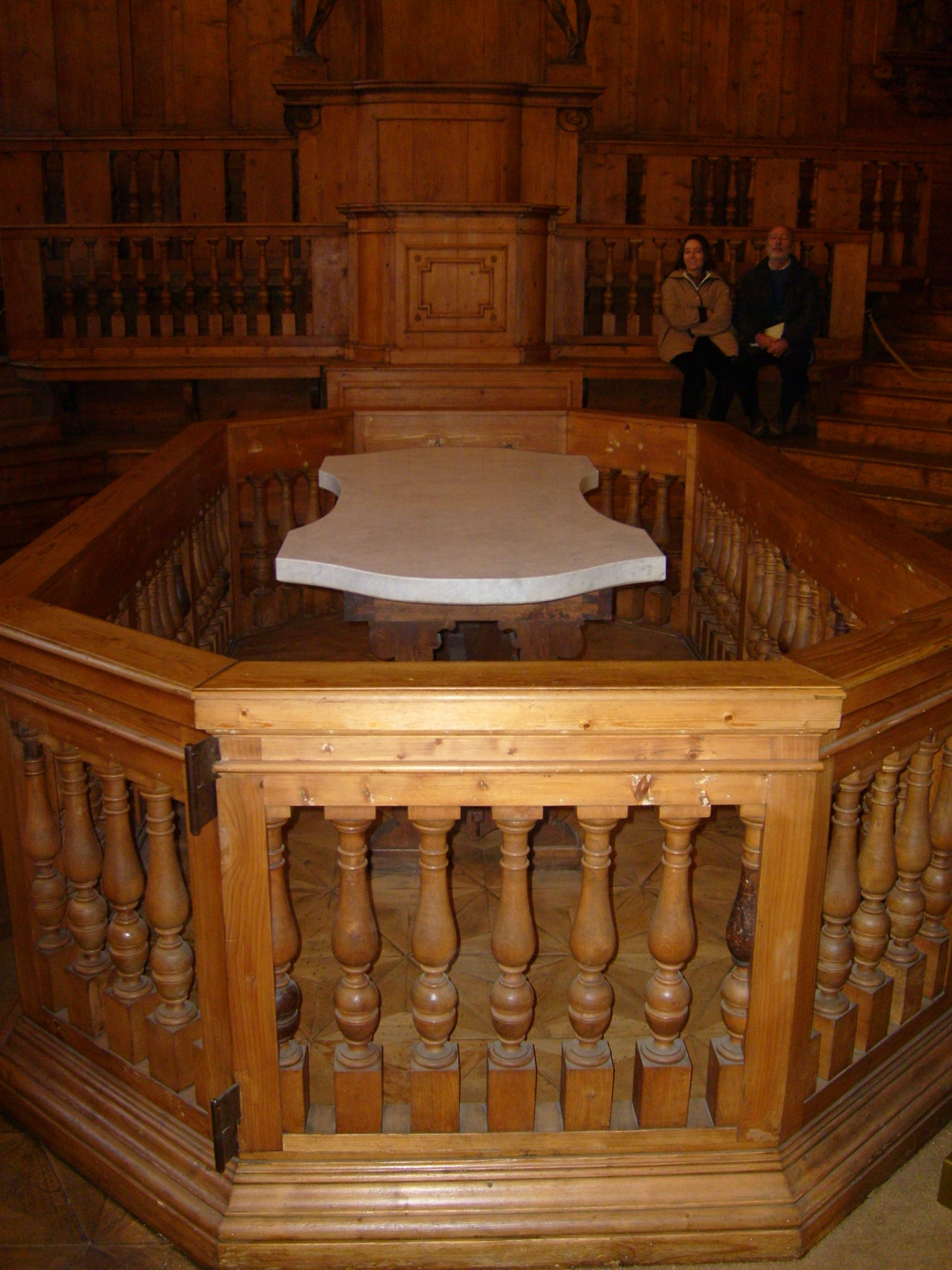
The dissection table

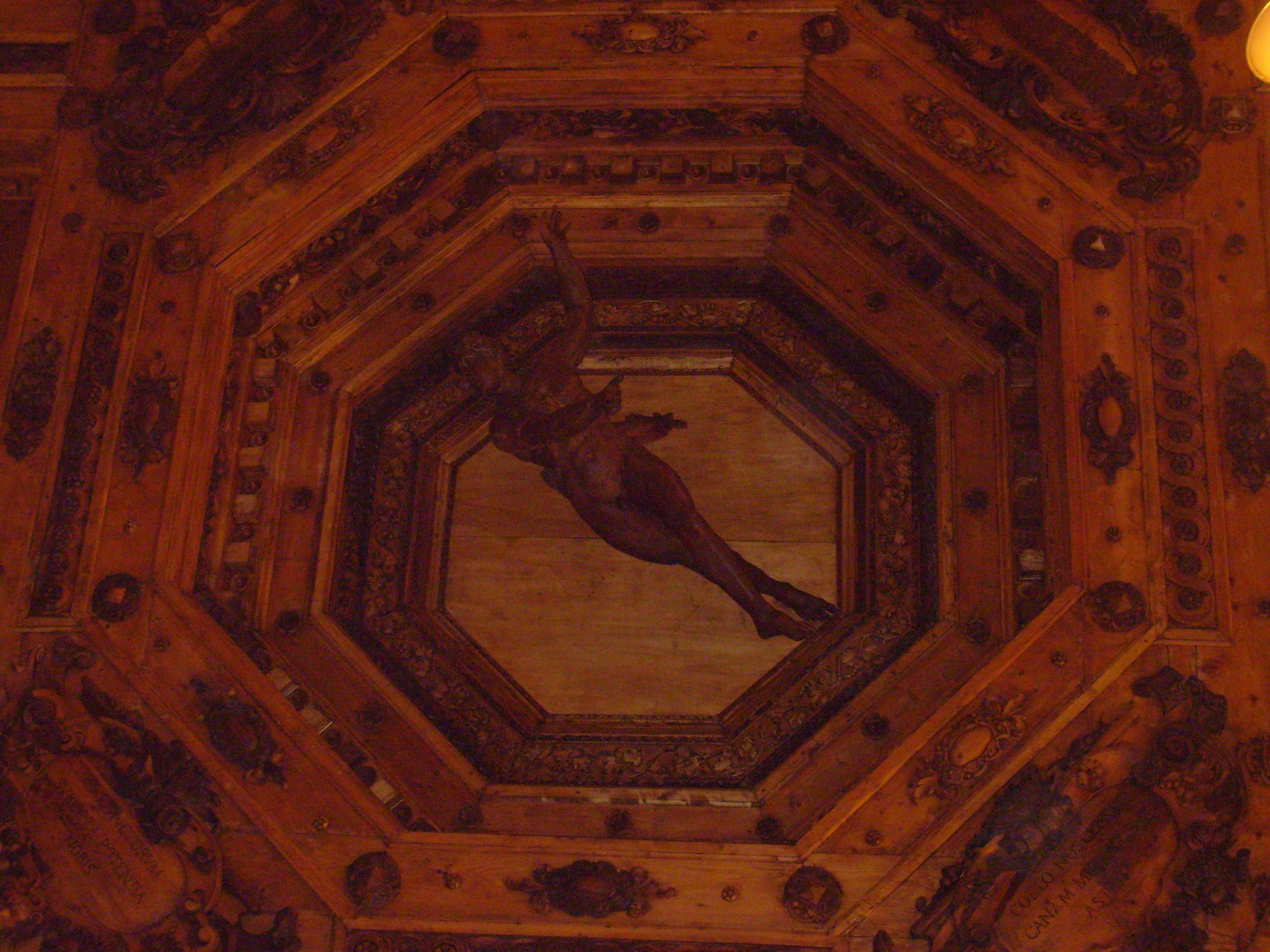
The statue of Apollo on the ceiling

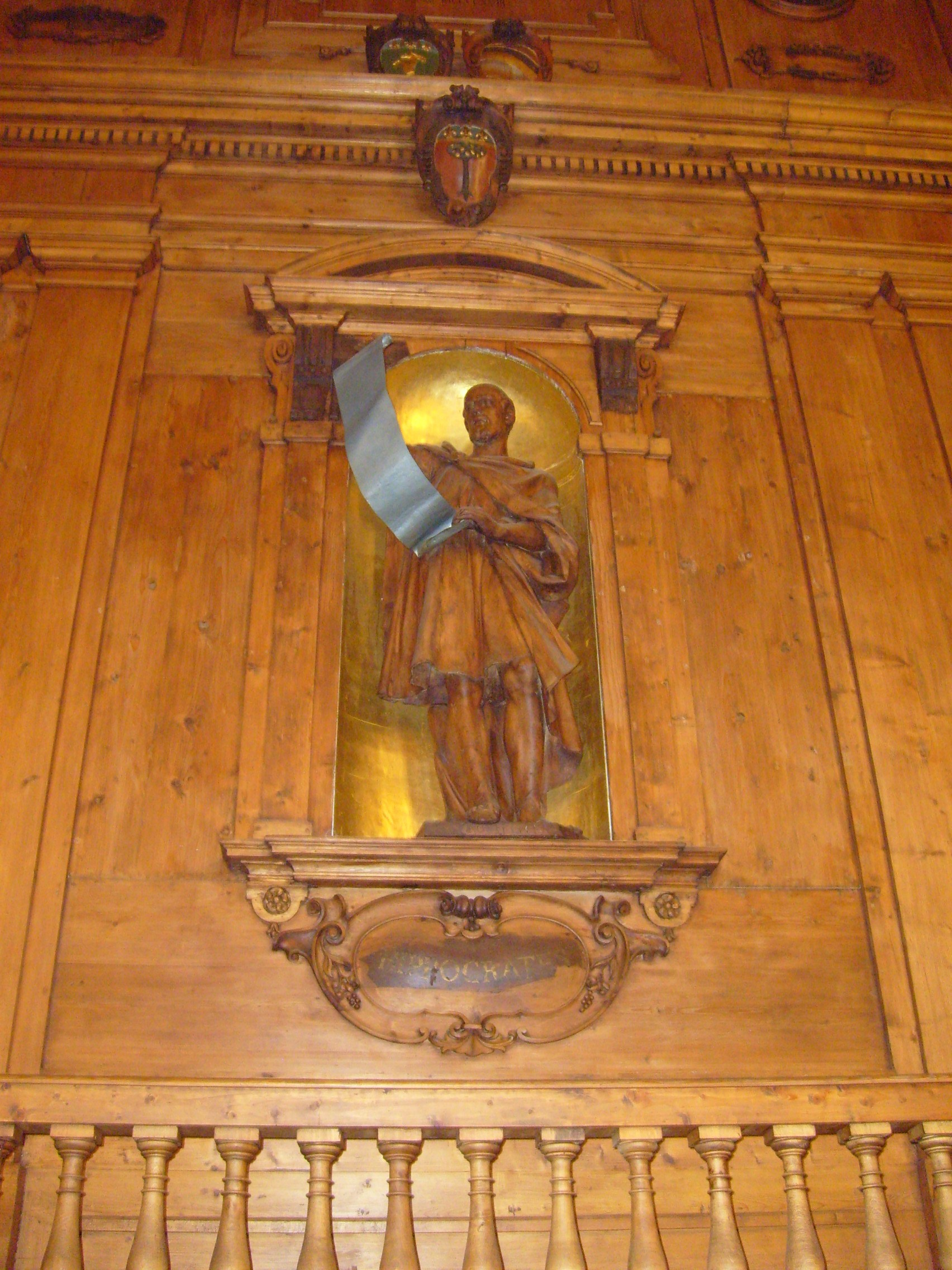
The statue of Hippocrates

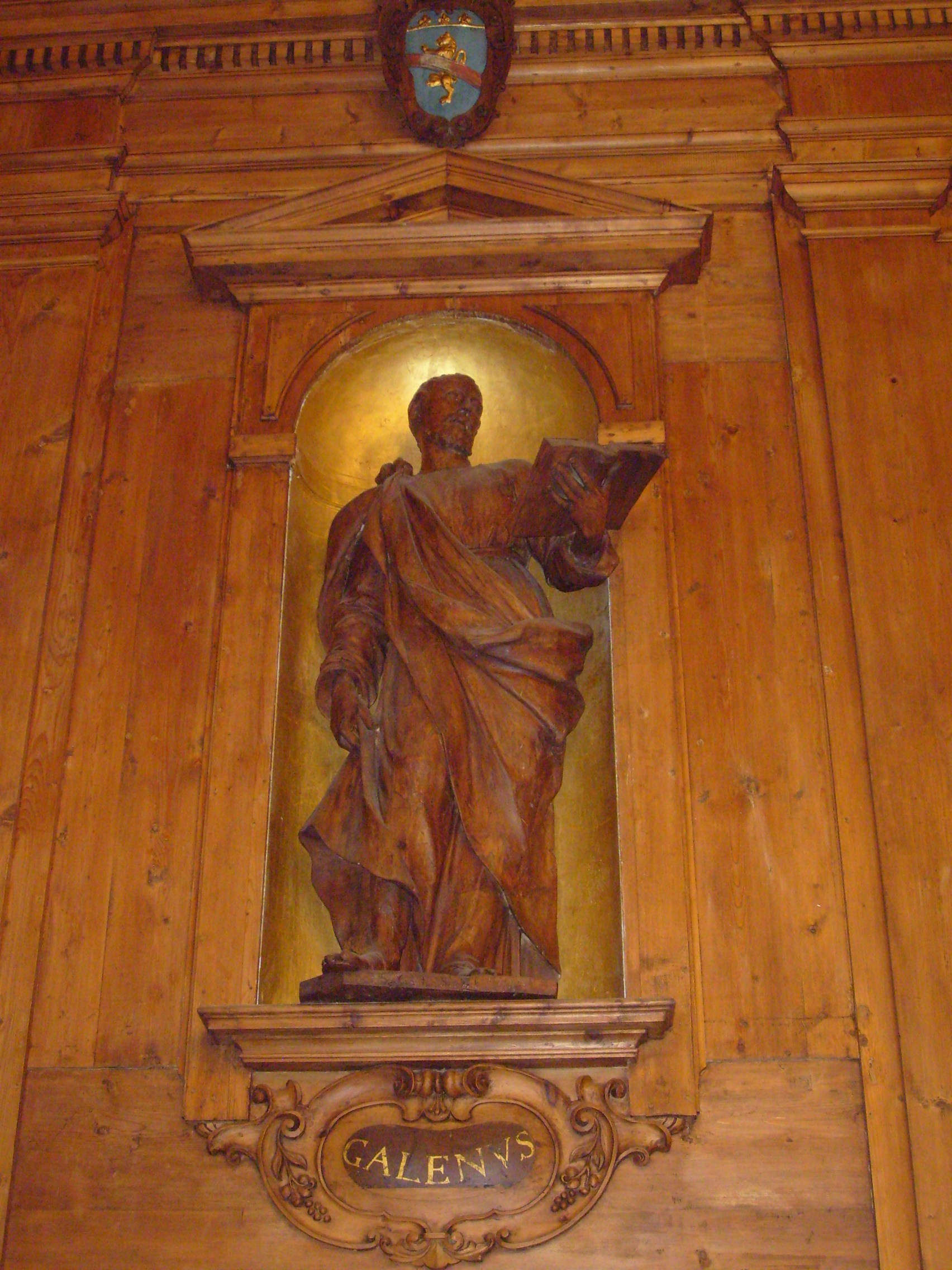
The statue of Galenus

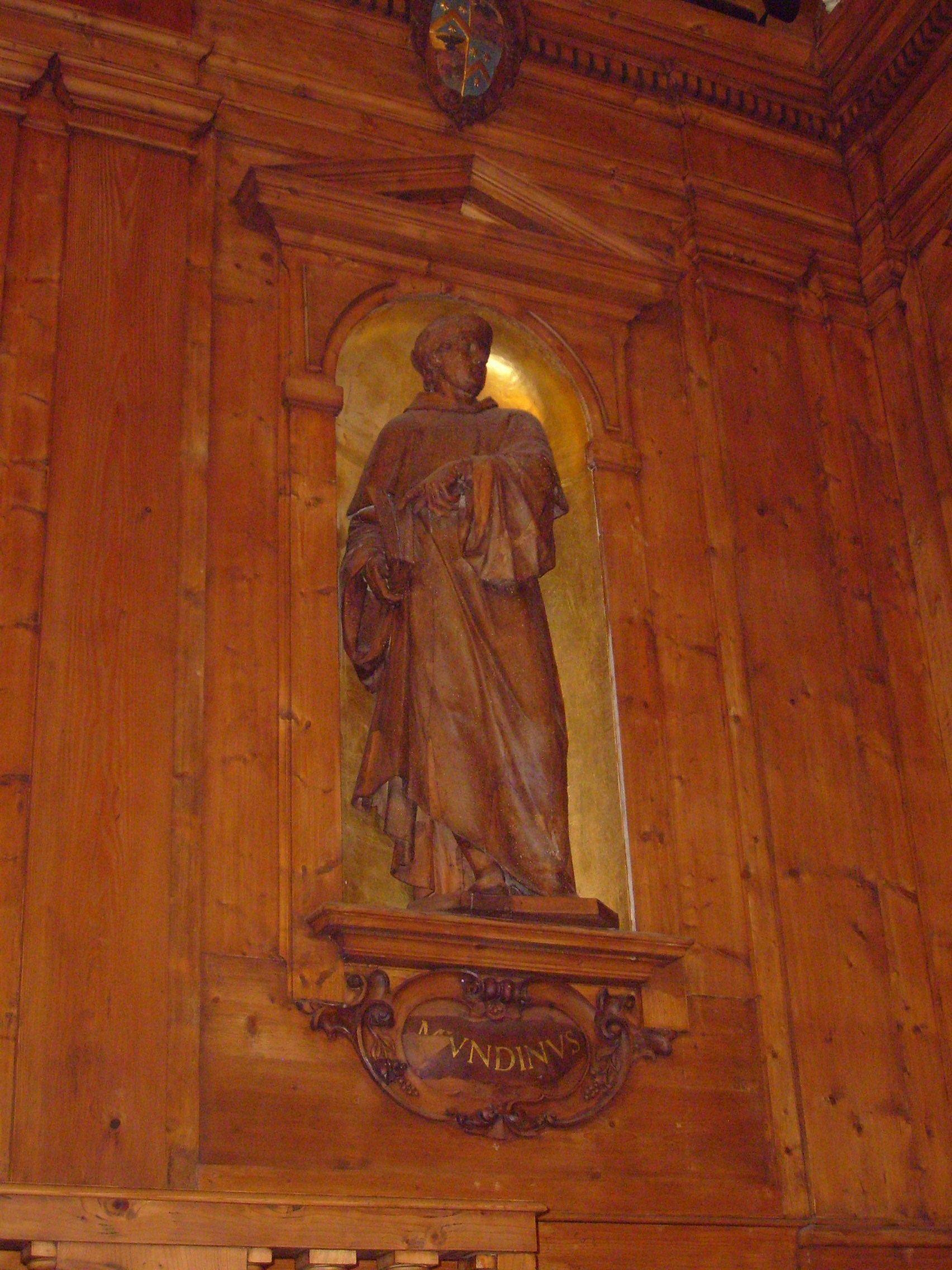
The statue of Mondino de Liuzzi

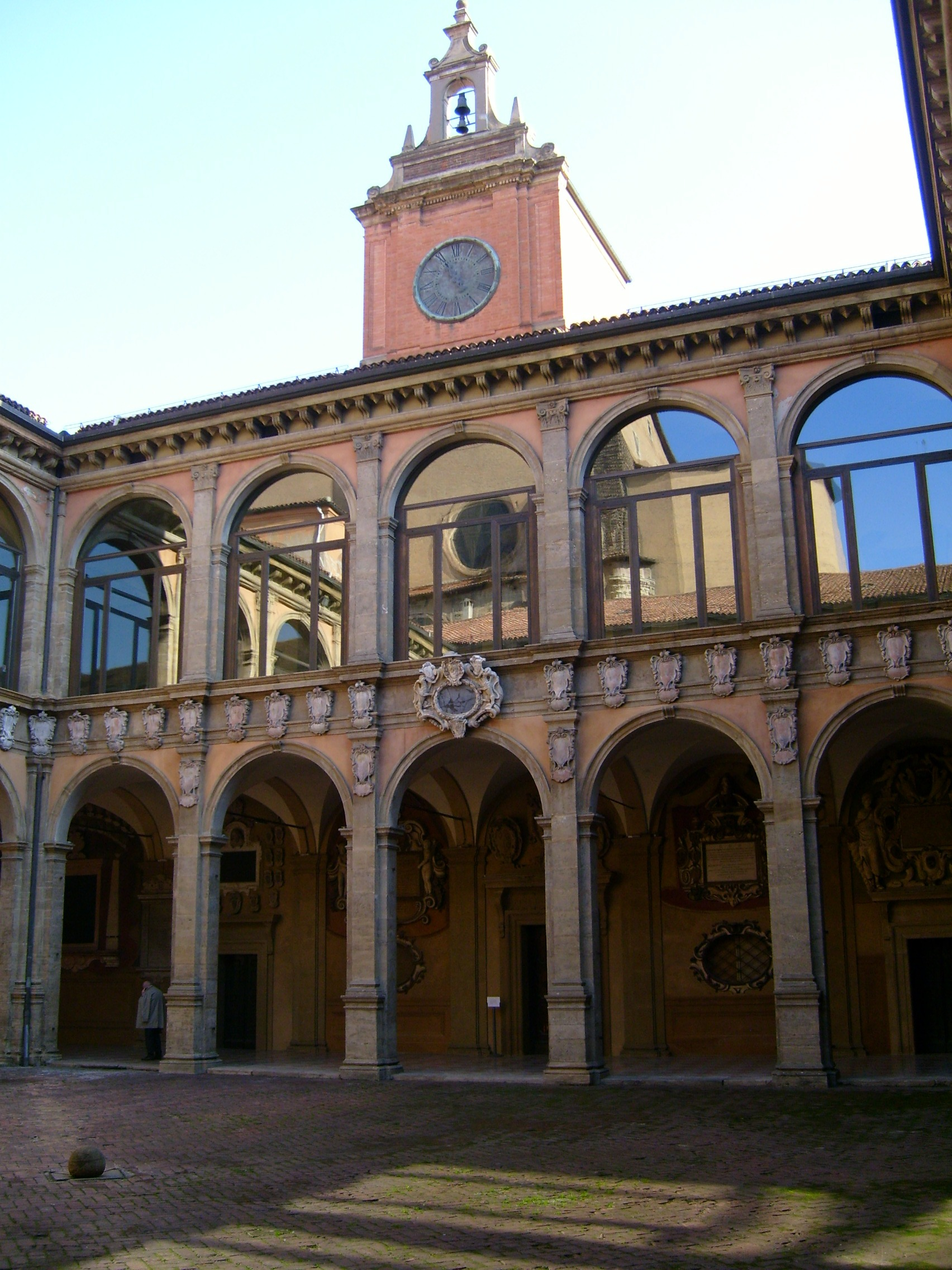
The wing of the palace which houses the Anatomical theatre today

Other anatomical theaters were found in the nearby towns of Padua and Ferrara.
