= Leiden anatomical theatre =

Former anatomical theatre and cabinet of curiosities of Leiden University, Netherlands

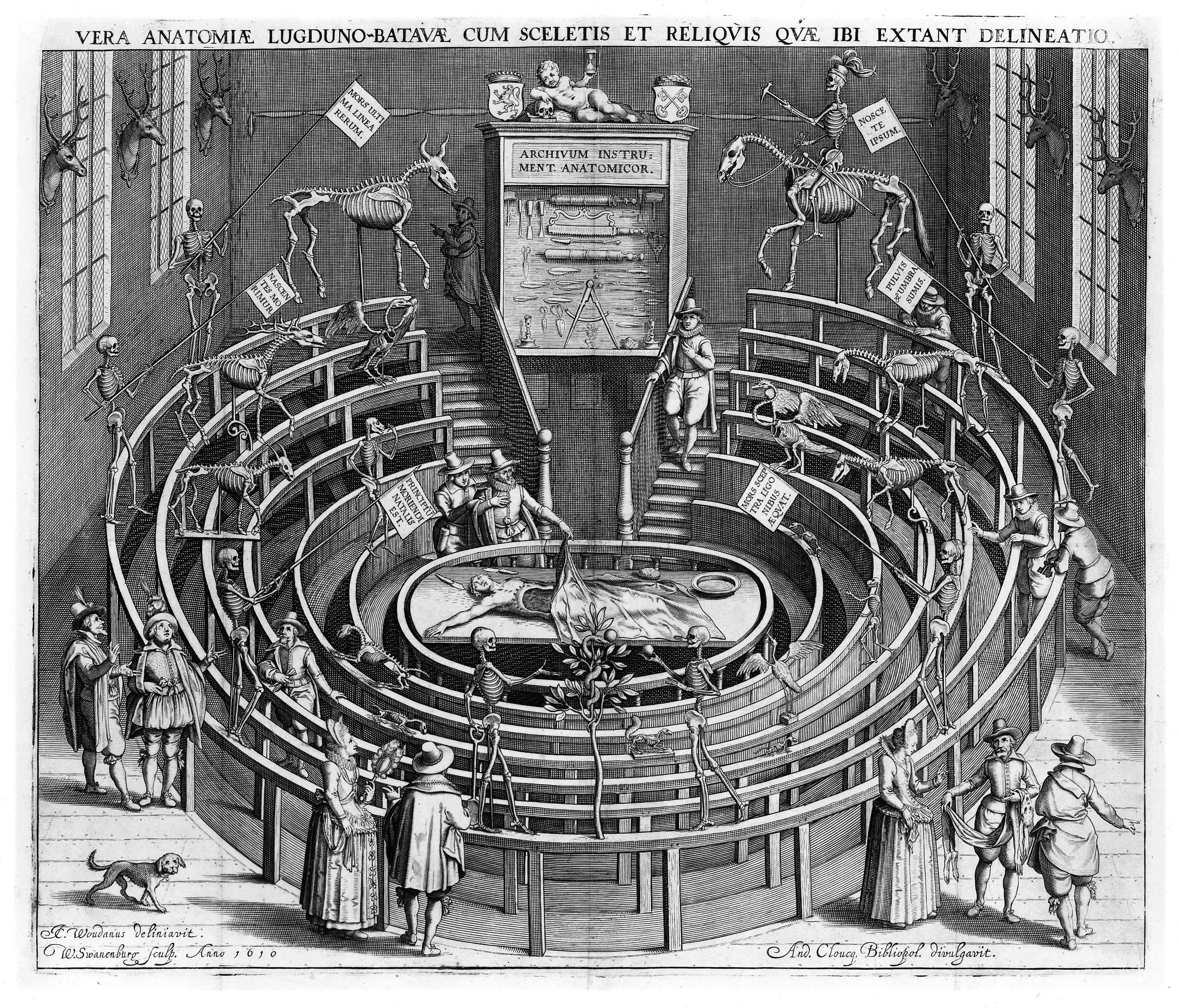
Leiden anatomical theatre in 1610.

The Theatrum Anatomicum or Leiden anatomical theatre was an anatomical theatre and cabinet of curiosities of Leiden University that opened in Leiden in the Netherlands in 1594. It was one of the first anatomical theatres in Europe.

The theatre was started on the initiative of Pieter Pauw, then professor of anatomy at Leiden University. During winters, professors of anatomy held public dissections of cadavers to a fee paying audience of students and surgeons, but also curious members of the public. As there was no teaching in the summer, the theatre was used to display various curiosities including human and animal skeletons, ancient Egyptian mummies and Roman antiquities, and many other unusual objects from different parts of the world. As a result the theatre, at a time the only in Europe north of the alps, became a significant tourist attraction. By the 18th century the theatre became less used, and eventually became obsolete. The theatre finally closed in 1821.

A modern reconstruction of this theatre can be seen in Museum Boerhaave in Leiden. The reconstruction at Rijksmuseum Boerhaave is based on manuscripts and prints from the Leiden anatomical theatre from 1610; the skeletons are of a more recent date. The University Room at Museum De Lakenhal in Leiden also features objects from the anatomical theatre. Collections originating in the theatre are also held in other Dutch museum collections.
