= Biblioteca comunale dell'Archiginnasio =

Coordinates: 44°29′32″N 11°20′37″E

Archiginnasio Municipal Library
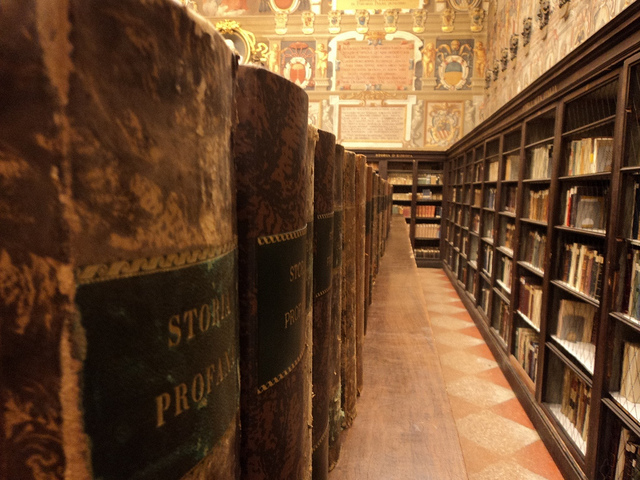
- Book repository for the library
- Location: Piazza Galvani 1 - 40124 Bologna, Italy
- Type: Public library
- Established: 1801

Collection
- Size: 1,202,773 item (2019), 1,223,448 item (2020), 1,247,458 item (2021), 1,360,964 item (2022), 1,139,965 volume, 2,500 item, 8,658 item (2019), 8,658 item (2022)

Other information
- Website: http://www.archiginnasio.it/english_index.html

The Biblioteca comunale dell'Archiginnasio (Archiginnasio Municipal Library) is a public library in Bologna, Italy. It is located inside the Palace of the Archiginnasio in Bologna since 1838, when a section of the building was destined to preserve the books collected from the closure of the religious orders made by Napoleon. The increase of the collections was pursued by purchasing and by donations from eminent people and scholars of Bologna, among them the cardinal Giuseppe Mezzofanti, Giovanni Gozzadini, Marco Minghetti, Giovanni Pascoli, Jacob Moleschott, Luigi Serra, Laura Bassi, Aurelio Saffi, Riccardo Bacchelli, Pelagio Palagi.

It is the largest library in Emilia-Romagna, it boasts some 850,000 volumes and pamphlets, 2,500 incunabula, 15,000 16th century editions, 8,500 manuscripts and then letters, collections of autographs, prints and drawings, and 250 archives. The library has also a section of 7,500 magazines.

All of this material, handwritten and printed collections, are of the utmost importance. They deal mainly with the civil, cultural, religious and social history of Bologna and its territory from the Middle Ages to the present day.

== Bibliography ==
- Edward Edwards (1869), "Free Town Libraries, Abroad: Italy", Free Town Libraries: Their Formation, Management, and History in Britain, France, Germany & America, New York: J. Wiley, OCLC 1385548, "Town Library of Bologna"
