= Anatomical theatre =

Specialised building or room used to teach anatomy at early modern universities

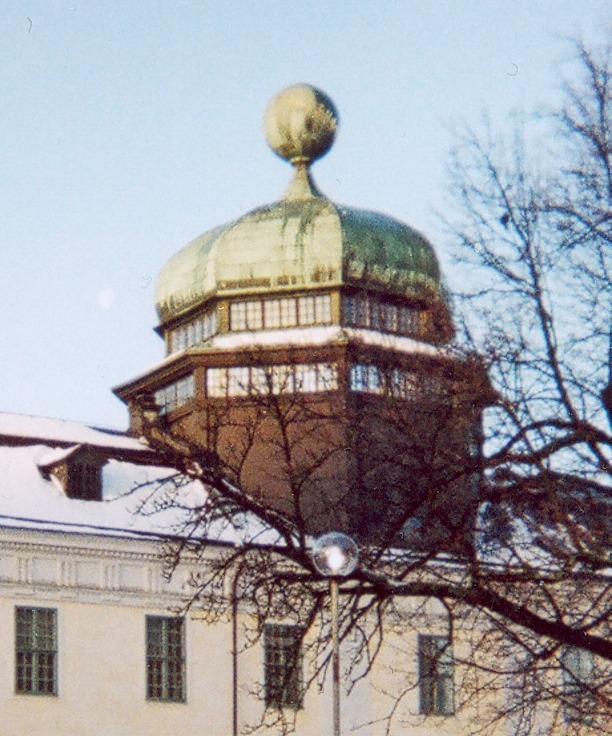
Detail of Gustavianum in Uppsala, showing the cupola housing the anatomical theatre from 1663

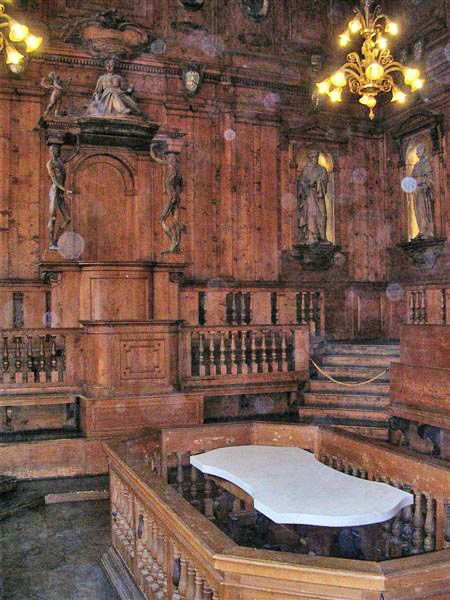
Anatomical theatre in the Archiginnasio of Bologna, constructed in 1637

An anatomical theatre (Latin: Theatrum Anatomicum) was a specialised building or room, resembling a theatre, used in teaching anatomy at early modern universities. They were typically constructed with a tiered structure surrounding a central table, allowing a larger audience to see the dissection of cadavers more closely than would have been possible in a non-specialized setting.

== Description ==
An anatomical theatre was usually a room of roughly amphitheatrical shape, in the centre of which would stand a table on which the dissection of human or animal bodies took place. Around this table were several circular, elliptic or octagonal tiers with railings, steeply tiered so that observers (typically students) could stand and observe the dissection below, without spectators in the front-most rows blocking their view. It was common to display skeletons in some location within the theatre.

The first anatomical theatre, the Anatomical Theatre of Padua, was built at the University of Padua in 1594, and has been preserved into the modern day. Other early examples include the Theatrum Anatomicum of Leiden University, built in 1596 and reconstructed in 1988, and the Anatomical Theatre of the Archiginnasio in Bologna (whose building dates from 1563 and the anatomical theatre from 1637).

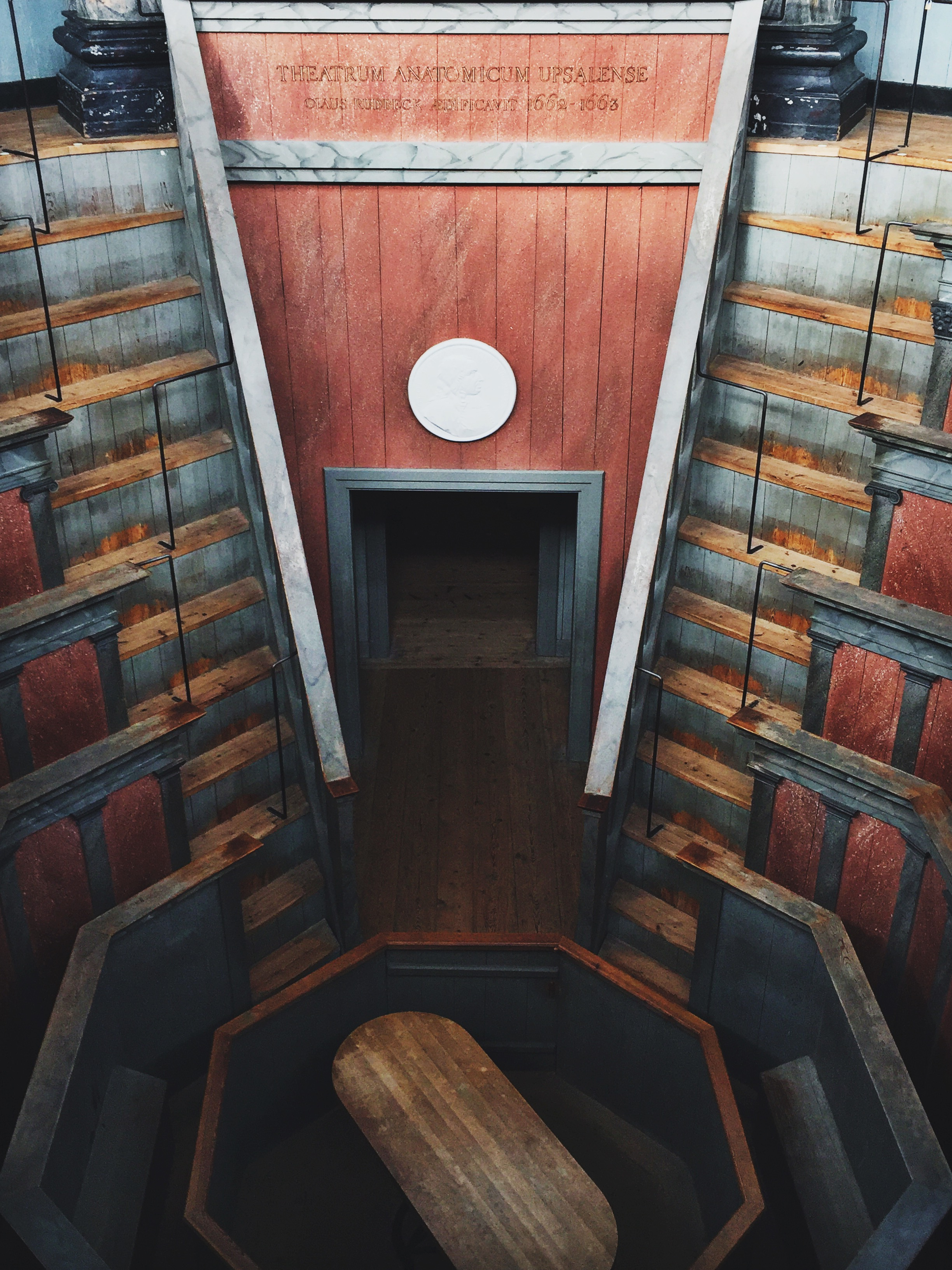
The anatomical theatre in Gustavianum in Uppsala, built in 1663

The anatomical theatre of the University of Uppsala is well-known, having been completed in 1663 by medical profession and amateur architect Olaus Rudbeck (1630–1702). The theatre is housed in the idiosyncratic cupola constructed on the top of the Gustavianum building, one of the older buildings of the university. Rudbeck had spent time in the Dutch city of Leiden, and the construction of both the anatomical theatre and the botanical garden he founded in Uppsala in 1655 were influenced by his experiences there. The anatomical theatre is now preserved as part of the Gustavianum, now preserved as a museum for the general public under the name Museum Gustavianum.

Thomas Jefferson built an anatomical theatre for the University of Virginia. It was completed in 1827, but demolished in 1939 after the construction of Alderman Library nearby.

== Gallery ==
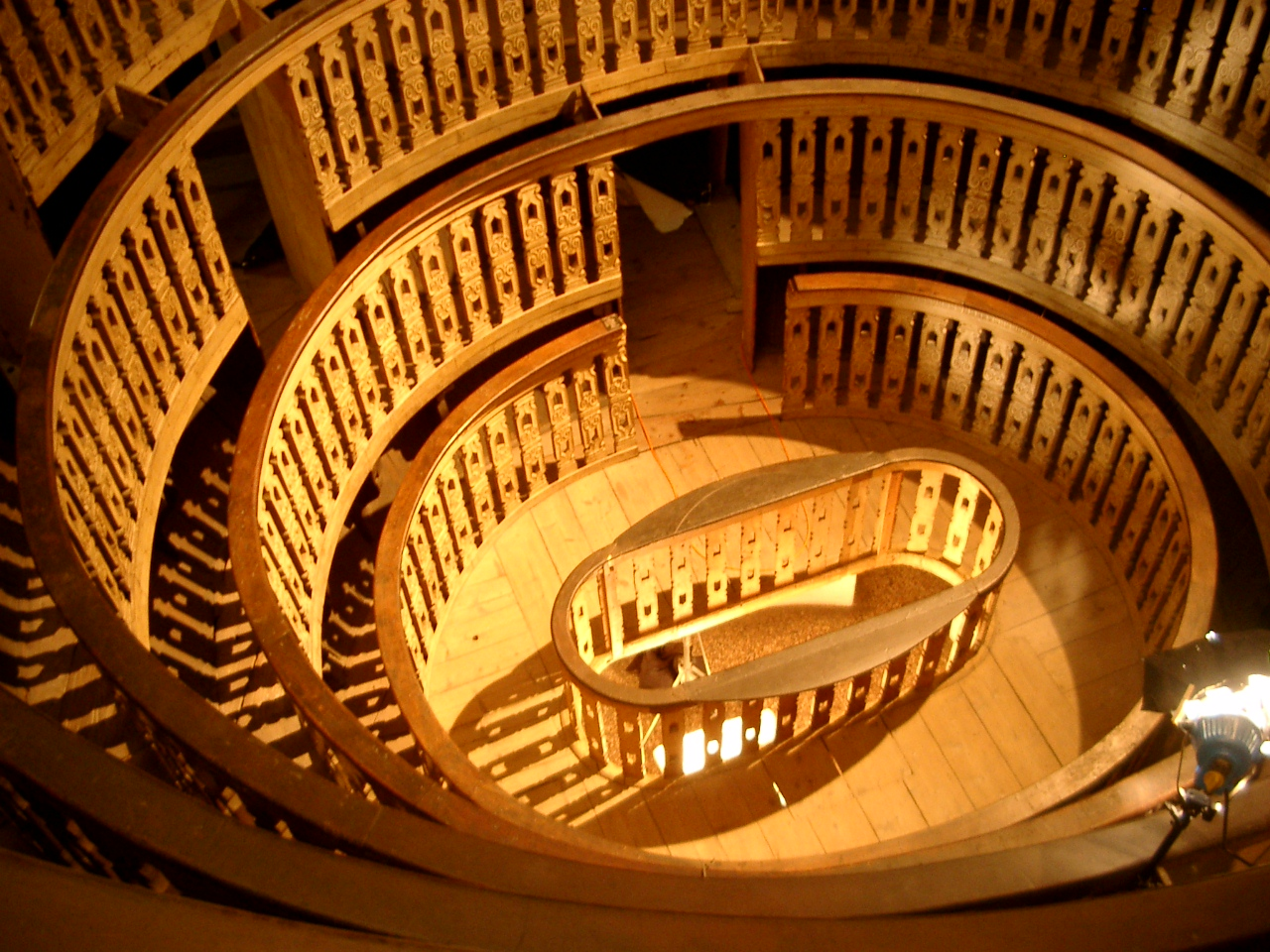
The first anatomical theatre University of Padua

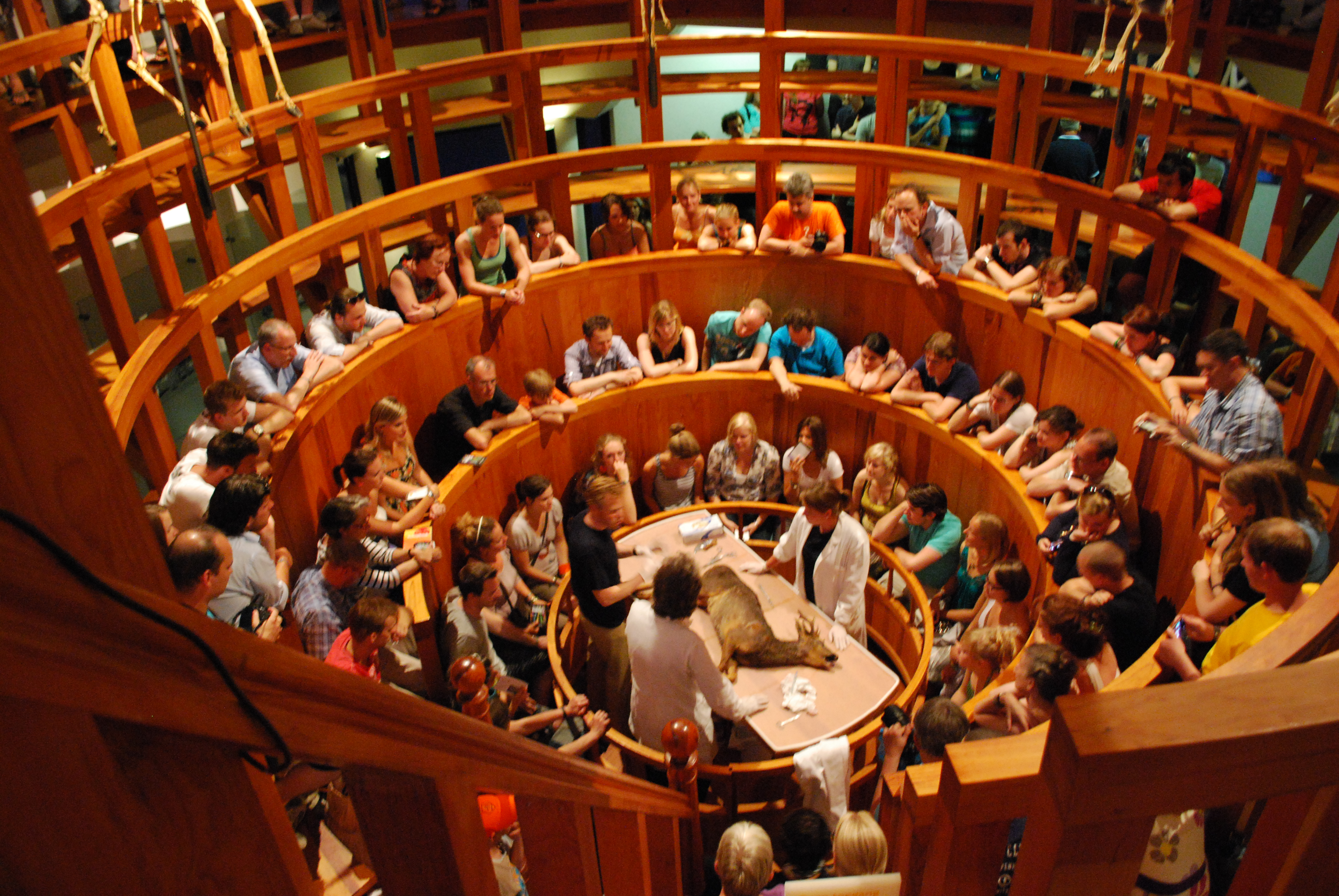
Veterinary demonstration in Museum Boerhaave, Leiden (2010)

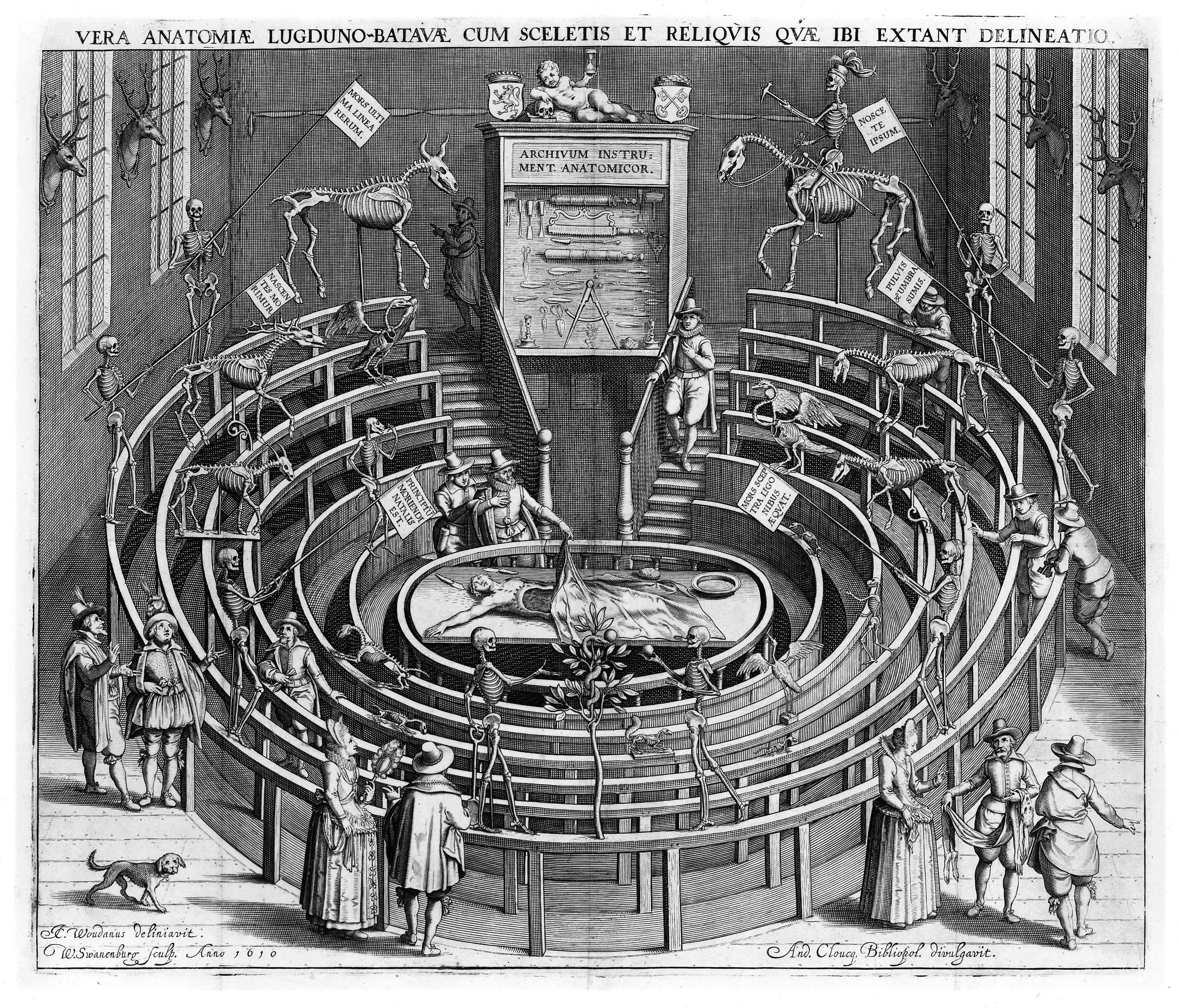
The anatomical theatre at Leiden University in the early 17th century

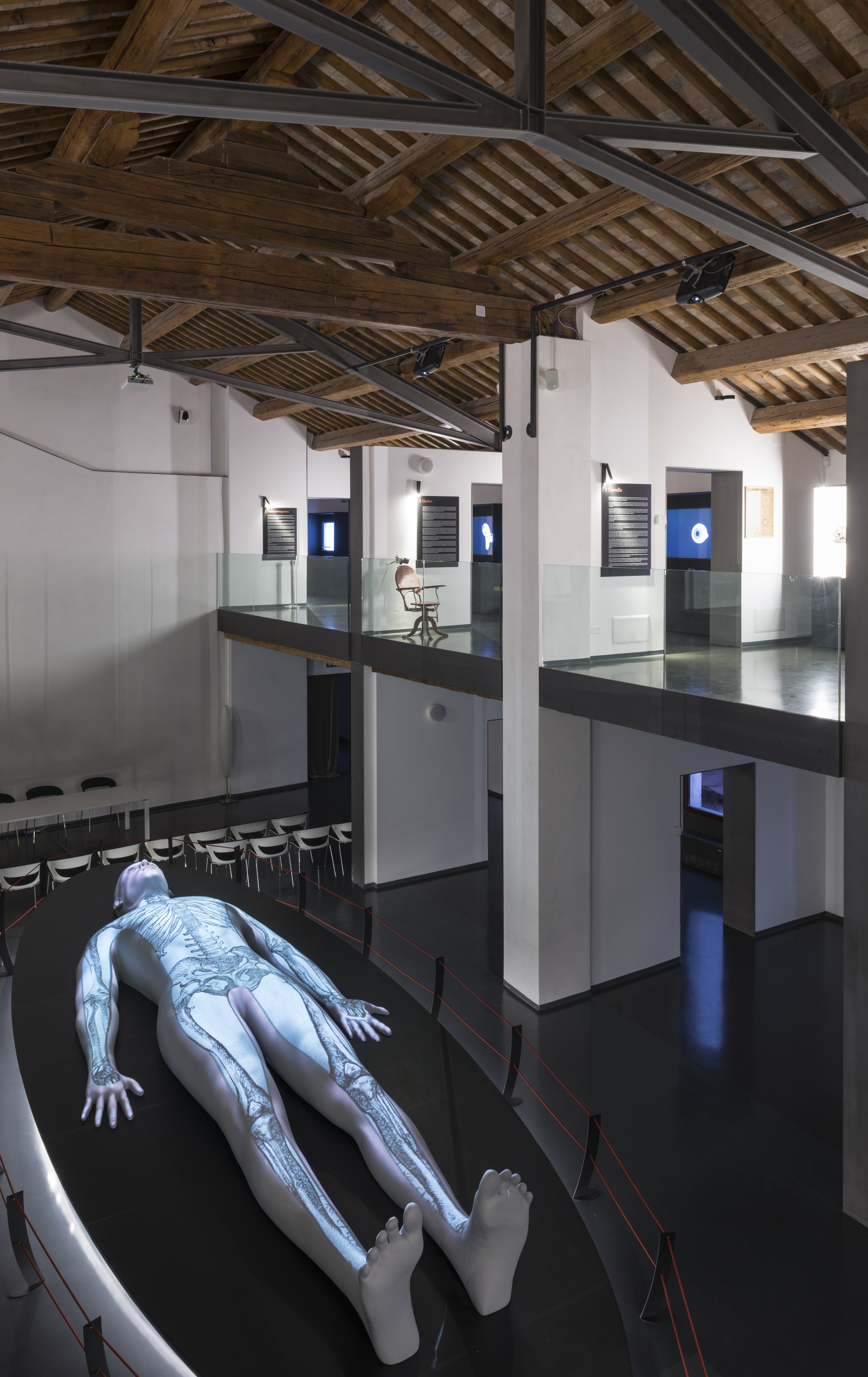
A modern anatomical theatre using projections on a body model, in the Musme museum in Padua.

== See also ==
- History of anatomy
- Operating theater
- Dutch Golden Age
