= Archiginnasio of Bologna =

Important historical building in Bologna, Italy

Coordinates: 44°29′32″N 11°20′37″E

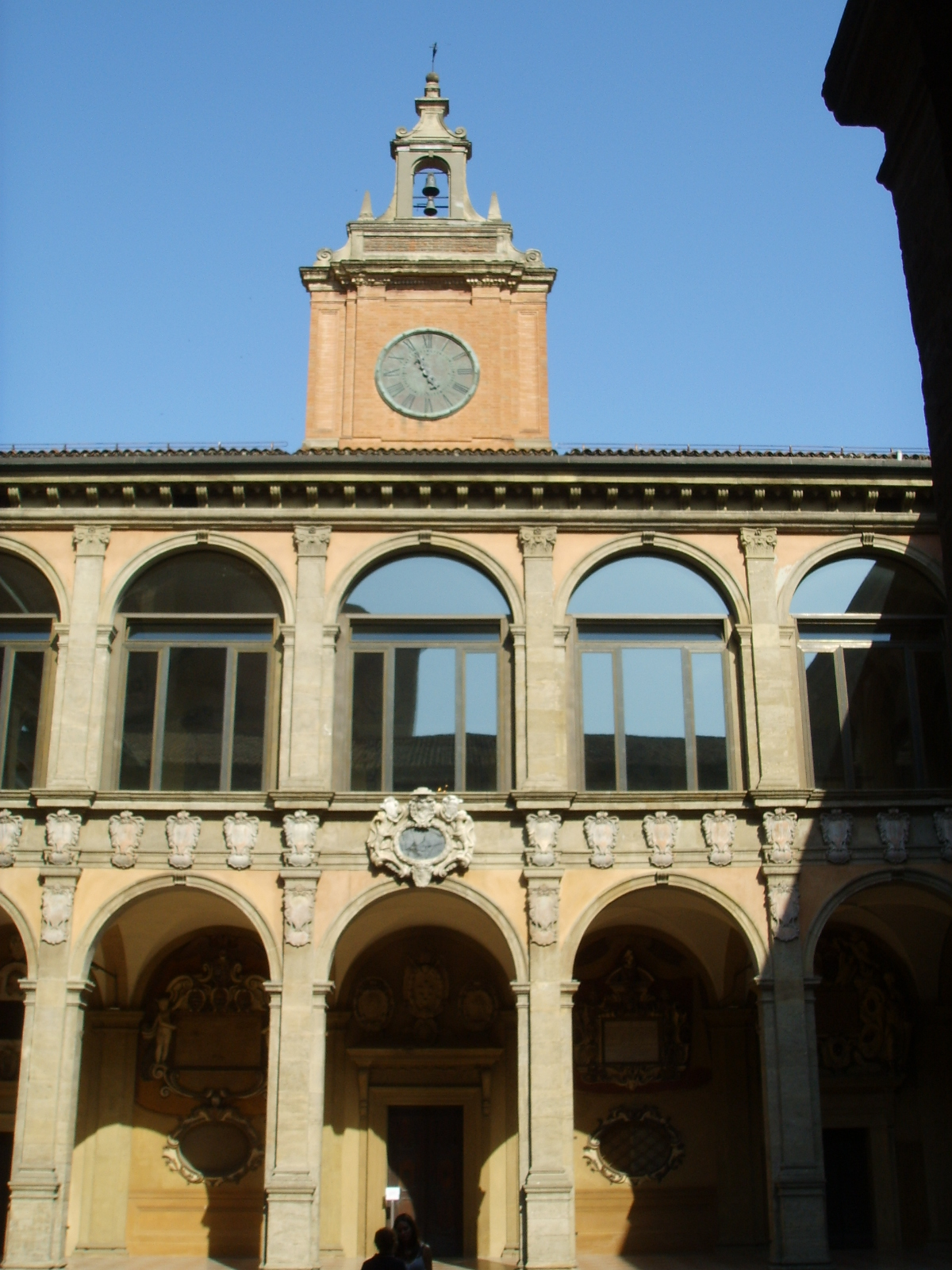
The palace seen from the inner courtyard

The Archiginnasio of Bologna is one of the most important buildings in the city of Bologna; once the main building of the University of Bologna, it currently houses the Archiginnasio Municipal Library and the Anatomical Theatre.

In the heart of the palace is the university Chapel of Santa Maria dei Bulgari, a reflection of history.

== History ==
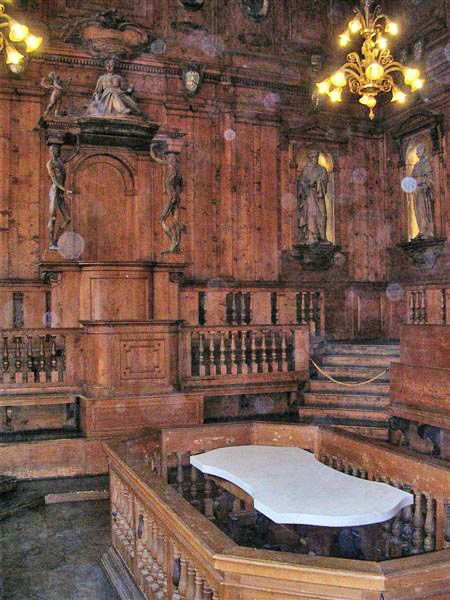
The anatomical theater, built in 1637

The construction of the Archiginnasio dates back to the 16th century, when the Piazza Maggiore was drastically remodeled under papal orders; the Fountain of Neptune was built during this same period. The construction of the Archiginnasio was commissioned by Pope Pius IV through papal legate Charles Borromeo and vice-legate Pier Donato Cesi during the years of the Council of Trent, who then entrusted the project to Antonio Morandi (known as il Terribilia). Construction began at the end of February 1562; built very quickly, it was inaugurated on October 21, 1563. The goal of this project was to create a single place where the Schools of the "Legisti" (Canon and Civil law) and "Artisti" (philosophy, medicine, mathematics, natural sciences and physics), previously located in various places across the town, could be hosted together. The building of the new "Schools" was named Archiginnasio after the classical term which was used to designate the Studium, as the University was first called, of Bologna.

The Archiginnasio ceased to be a University in 1803 when the University was moved to Palazzo Poggi where it is still located today. Scuole Pie (primary schools) were housed in this building for a few years and later, from 1838 onwards, were replaced by the city library. Archiginnasio Municipal Library is the largest library in Emilia-Romagna. It was first established to keep the books collected from the closure of the religious orders made by Napoleon. It houses 850,000 volumes and pamphlets, including 2,000 incunabula, about 15,000 16th century editions, 8,500 manuscripts, letters, collections of autographs, prints and drawings and 250 archives. All of this material, handwritten and printed collections, are of the utmost importance. They deal with the civil, cultural, religious and social history of Bologna and its territory.

Upon entering, visitors are asked to hand over all bags and writing materials which can be picked up when leaving.

== The building ==
Externally the building presents a porch some 139 meters long comprising thirty arches supported by sandstone columns, inside a central courtyard with two lines of loggias that surround the former church of Santa Maria dei Bulgari. Two stairways lead to the upper floor where are located the study rooms of the legisti (students of civil and canon law) and the artisti (students of other subjects such as philosophy, literature and medicine). Each of the legisti and the artisti had five classrooms in their respective wings. However, only the legisti, who were considered the university's top students, had their classrooms in the main hallway. At the end of each wing are two great halls, one of them now the library's reading room, the other one now used as a congress room and known as the "Sala dello Stabat Mater" in memory of the first performance of Rossini's Stabat Mater, directed by Gaetano Donizetti, on March 18, 1842.

The walls of the building form an enormous heraldic complex, made up of six thousand coats of arms painted on its walls. The honor of putting a coat of arms on the walls was reserved for those students who were elected by other students as heads of the nationes (student organizations), and called councillors. The coats of arms indicate the home country or city of the student, along with the student's name. On the walls of the lower portico are located a number of busts from the 17th century portraying lecturers from the university. On the walls it is also possible to notice the connection with the papal authority (Bologna was the second most major city of the Papal States)—many are the coats of arms with the symbols of the church: the triple crowns, St. Peter's keys and the clerical hats.

Reflecting the prestige of the families who attended the University, the heraldic complex also includes the insignia of illustrious Bolognese houses such as the Bentivoglio, Pepoli, Biancuzzi, and Malvezzi, who significantly contributed to the city's political and cultural life.

== Anatomical theatre ==
The upper level of the building still houses the anatomical theatre, which was built in 1636 by Antonio Levanti. It was the hall used for anatomy lectures and displays. It is shaped like an amphitheater and made from fir wood with a coffer ceiling, decorated with statues. It is overlooked by the ornate seat of the professor, topped by a baldaquin and supported by the statues of two naked and skinless men, known as "gli spellati" (the skinned ones), made by Ercole Lelli. The numerous sculptures that decorated the walls represent doctors from ancient and modern times: the busts are of people considered of lesser importance, while the most revered are represented in full. The two main statues, from left to right, represent Hippocrates and Galen, the most prominent physicians of Greece and Rome, respectively. Another statue on the wall opposite the chair represents a medic holding a nose in his hand: it is a portrayal of Bologna native Gaspare Tagliacozzi, an early pioneer of rhinoplasty.

As a result of Allied bombings on January 29, 1944, the room suffered extensive damage, but was subsequently reconstructed with exemplary philological rigour, using all the surviving elements retrieved from the rubble.

== Bibliography ==
- The Palace of the Archiginnasio in Bologna, Bologna: Tipografia Metropolitana, 2010
- Michael Kiene, L'architettura del Collegio di Spagna e dell'Archiginnasio. Esame comparato dell'architettura universitaria bolognese con quella europea, en "Annali di Storia delle Università italiane", volumen 1, 1997
- Touring Club Italiano. Bologna. Trieste: Editoriale Lloyd, 2000. Print. (in Italian)

== Image gallery ==
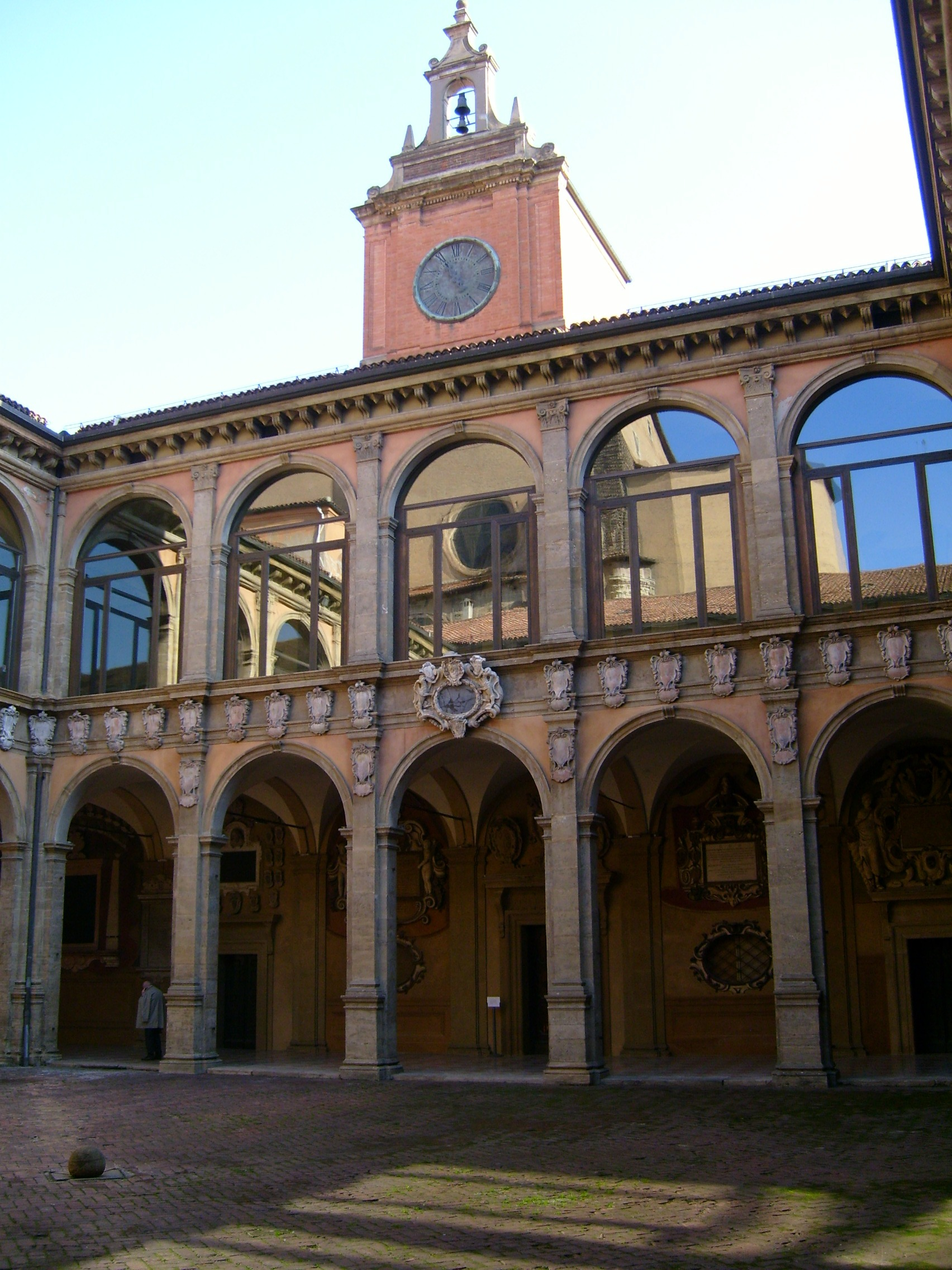
The palace seen from the inner courtyard.

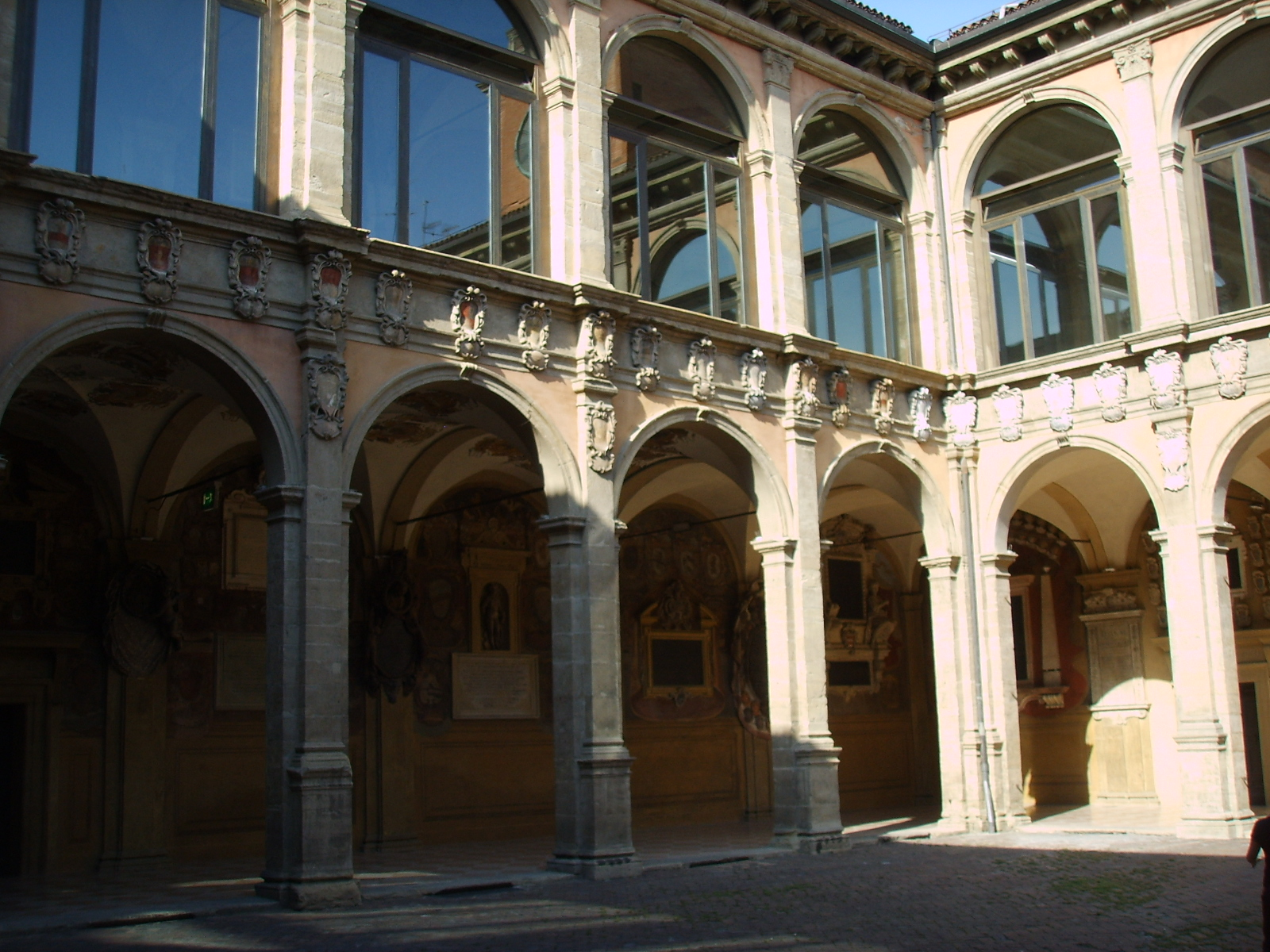
The inner courtyard.

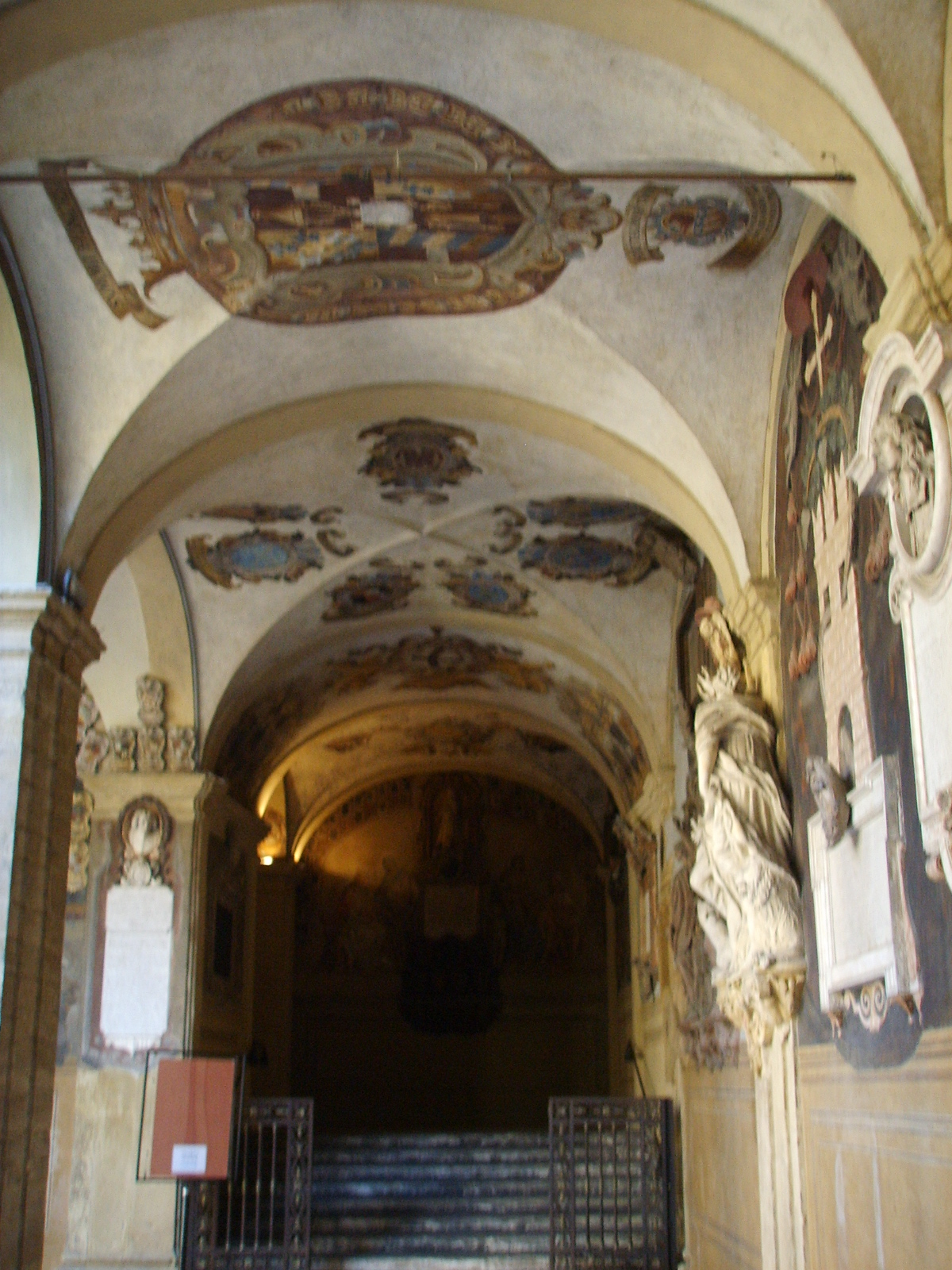
The inner courtyard portico. Access to the staircases.

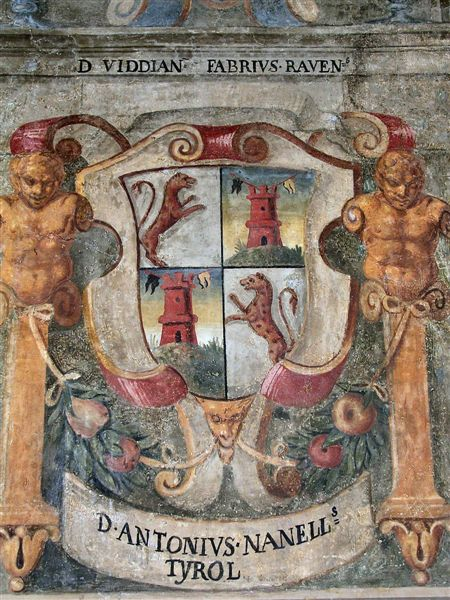
Student's coats of arms

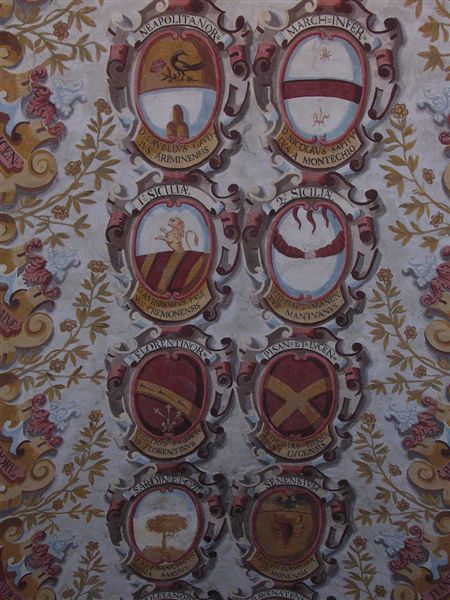
Other coats of arms

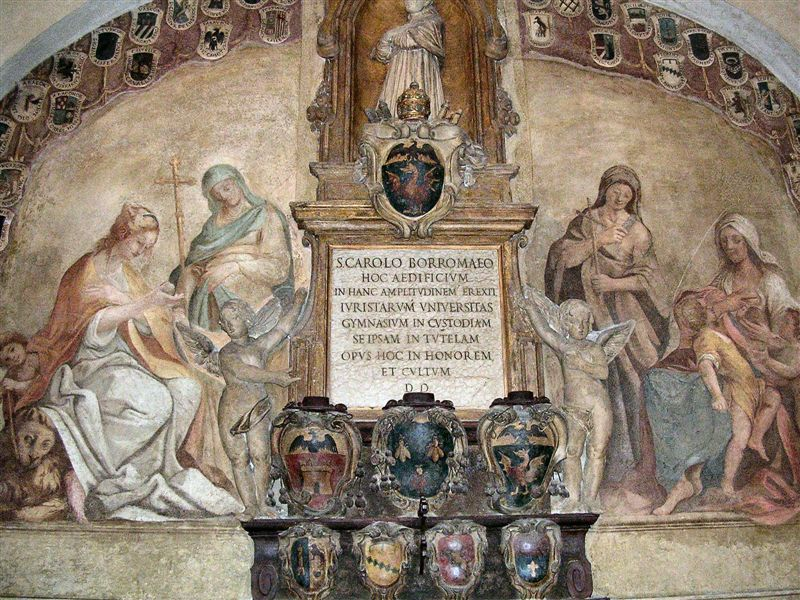
Inscription in honor to Charles Borromeo

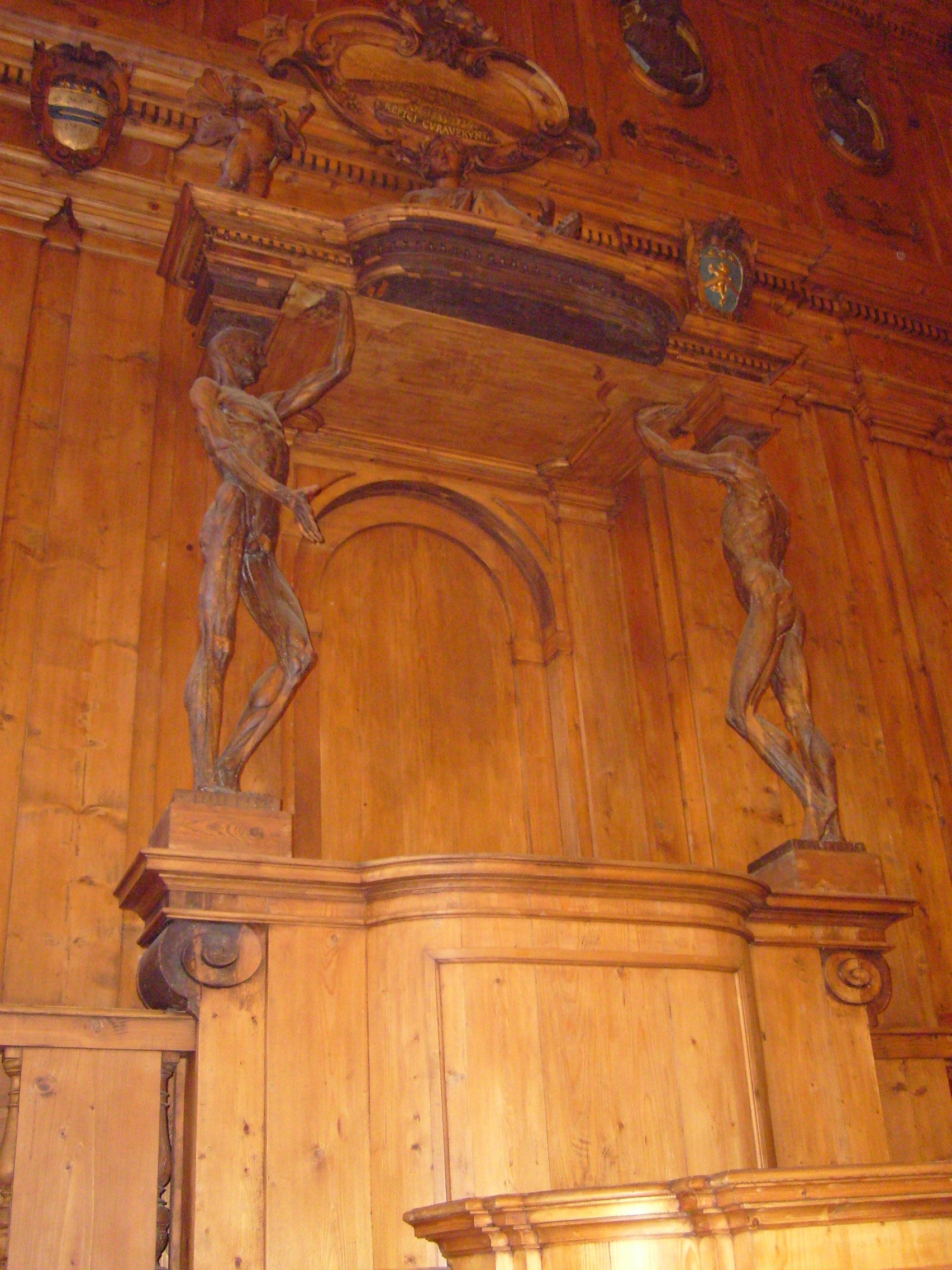
Anatomical theatre. The baldequin of the "spellati".

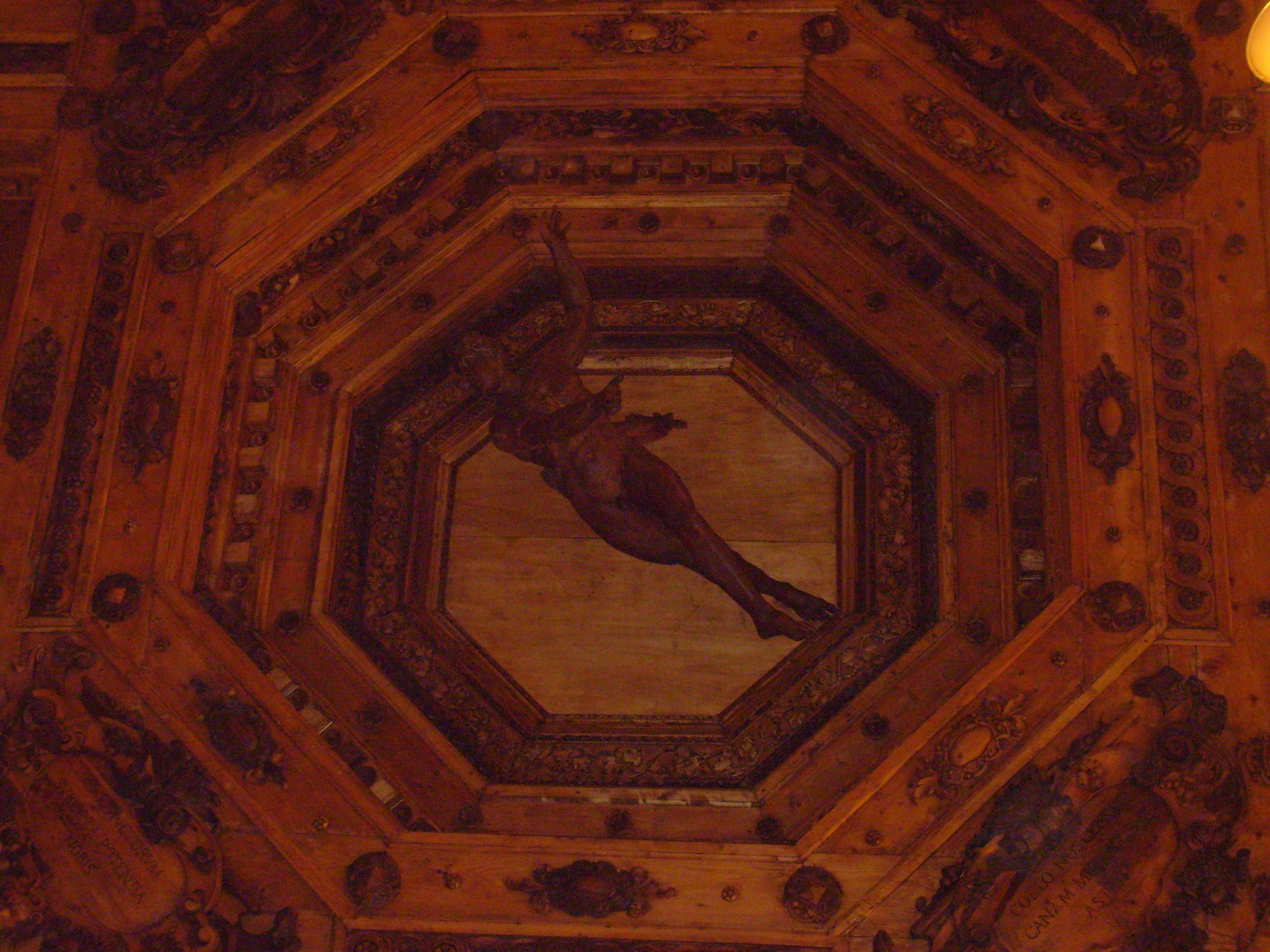
Anatomical Theater. Wooden ceiling with statue of Apollo.

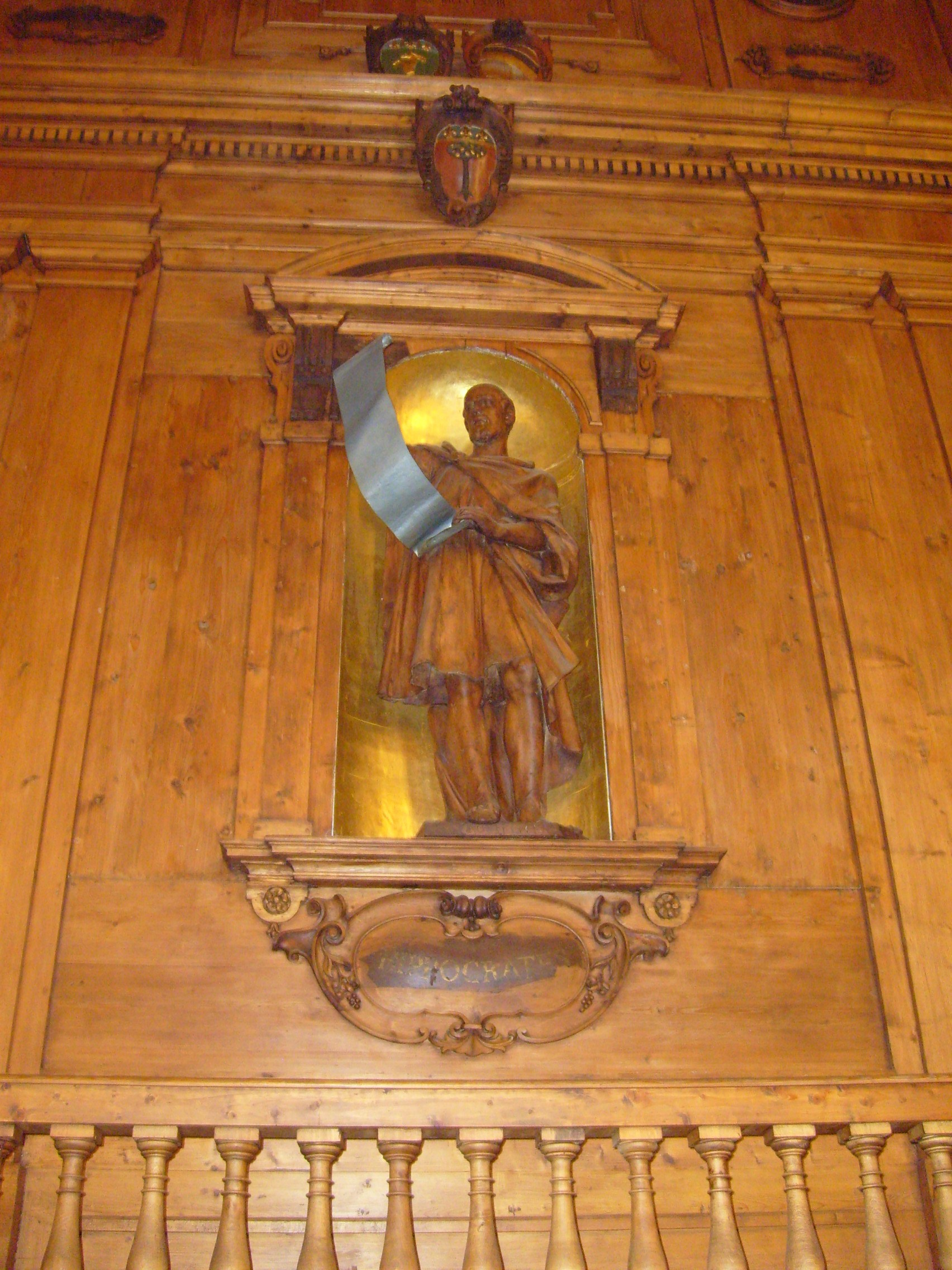
Teatro anatómico. Statue of Hippocrates.

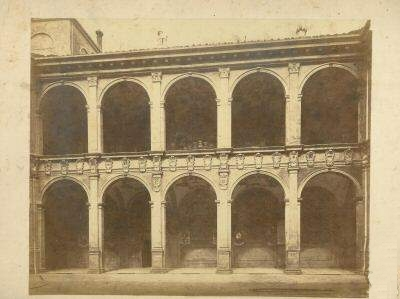
Inner courtyard. Historic photograph by Pietro Poppi (1883–1914)
